The Iran–Iraq War was an armed conflict between Iran and Iraq that lasted from September 1980 to August 1988. It began with the Iraqi invasion of Iran and lasted for almost eight years, until the acceptance of United Nations Security Council Resolution 598 by both sides. Iraq's primary rationale for the attack against Iran cited the need to prevent Ruhollah Khomeini—who had spearheaded Iran's Islamic Revolution in 1979—from exporting the new Iranian ideology to Iraq; there were also fears among the Iraqi leadership of Saddam Hussein that Iran, a theocratic state with a population predominantly composed of Shia Muslims, would exploit sectarian tensions in Iraq by rallying Iraq's Shia majority against the Baʽathist government, which was officially secular and dominated by Sunni Muslims. Iraq also wished to replace Iran as the power player in the Persian Gulf, which was not seen as an achievable objective prior to the Islamic Revolution because of Pahlavi Iran's economic and military superiority as well as its close relationships with the United States and Israel.

The Iran–Iraq War followed a long-running history of territorial border disputes between the two states, as a result of which Iraq planned to retake the eastern bank of the Shatt al-Arab that it had ceded to Iran in the 1975 Algiers Agreement. Iraqi support for Arab separatists in Iran increased following the outbreak of hostilities; while claims arose suspecting that Iraq was seeking to annex Iran's Khuzestan province, Saddam Hussein publicly stated in November 1980 that Iraq was not seeking an annexation of any Iranian territory. It is believed that Iraq had sought to establish suzerainty over Khuzestan. While the Iraqi leadership had hoped to take advantage of Iran's post-revolutionary chaos and expected a decisive victory in the face of a severely weakened Iran, the Iraqi military only made progress for three months, and by December 1980, the Iraqi invasion had stalled. The Iranian military began to gain momentum against the Iraqis and regained virtually all lost territory by June 1982. After pushing Iraqi forces back to the pre-war border lines, Iran rejected United Nations Security Council Resolution 514 and launched an invasion of Iraq. The subsequent Iranian offensive within Iraqi territory lasted for five years, with Iraq taking back the initiative in mid-1988 and subsequently launching a series of major counter-offensives that ultimately led to the conclusion of the war in a stalemate.

The eight years of war-exhaustion, economic devastation, decreased morale, military stalemate, inaction by the international community towards the use of weapons of mass destruction by Iraqi forces on Iranian soldiers and civilians, as well as increasing Iran–United States military tensions all culminated in Iran's acceptance of a ceasefire brokered by the United Nations Security Council. In total, around 500,000 people were killed during the Iran–Iraq War (with Iran bearing the larger share of the casualties), excluding the tens of thousands of civilians killed in the concurrent Anfal campaign that targeted Iraqi Kurdistan. The end of the conflict resulted in neither reparations nor border changes, and the combined financial losses suffered by both combatants is believed to have exceeded . There were a number of proxy forces operating for both countries: Iraq and the pro-Iraqi Arab separatist militias in Iran were most notably supported by the National Council of Resistance of Iran; whereas Iran re-established an alliance with the Iraqi Kurds, being primarily supported by the Kurdistan Democratic Party and the Patriotic Union of Kurdistan. During the conflict, Iraq received an abundance of financial, political, and logistical aid from the United States, the United Kingdom, the Soviet Union, France, Italy, Yugoslavia, and the overwhelming majority of Arab countries. While Iran was comparatively isolated to a large degree, it received a significant amount of aid from Syria, Libya, China, North Korea, Israel, Pakistan, and South Yemen.

The conflict has been compared to World War I in terms of the tactics used by both sides, including large-scale trench warfare with barbed wire stretched across fortified defensive lines, manned machine-gun posts, bayonet charges, Iranian human wave attacks, Iraq's extensive use of chemical weapons, and deliberate attacks on civilian targets. A notable feature of the war was the state-sanctioned glorification of martyrdom among Iranian children; the discourses on martyrdom formulated in the Iranian Shia Islamic context led to the widespread usage of human wave attacks and thus had a lasting impact on the dynamics of the conflict.

Terminology
The war is known in the Arab world and a few other regions as the First Gulf War, whereas Western sources use that name to refer to the conflict between the American-led coalition and Iraq in 1991. The Iran–Iraq War was originally referred to as the Persian Gulf War until the 1990–1991 Persian Gulf War, after which the previous war was dubbed the First Persian Gulf War. However besides the Iran-Iraq war, the 1990 Iraq–Kuwait conflict, as well as The Iraq War from 2003 to 2011 have all been called the Second Persian Gulf War. In Iran, the war is known as the Imposed War and the Holy Defense. State media in Iraq dubbed the war Saddam's Qadisiyyah, in reference to the seventh-century Battle of al-Qādisiyyah, in which Arab warriors overcame the Sasanian Empire during the Muslim conquest of Iran.

Background

Iran–Iraq relations

In April 1969, Iran abrogated the 1937 treaty over the Shatt al-Arab and Iranian ships stopped paying tolls to Iraq when they used the Shatt al-Arab. The Shah argued that the 1937 treaty was unfair to Iran because almost all river borders around the world ran along the thalweg, and because most of the ships that used the Shatt al-Arab were Iranian. Iraq threatened war over the Iranian move, but on 24 April 1969, an Iranian tanker escorted by Iranian warships (Joint Operation Arvand) sailed down the Shatt al-Arab, and Iraq—being the militarily weaker state—did nothing. The Iranian abrogation of the 1937 treaty marked the beginning of a period of acute Iraqi-Iranian tension that was to last until the Algiers Agreement of 1975.

The relationship between the governments of Iran and Iraq briefly improved in 1978, when Iranian agents in Iraq discovered plans for a pro-Soviet coup d'état against Iraq's government. When informed of this plot, Saddam ordered the execution of dozens of his army's officers, and in a sign of reconciliation, expelled from Iraq Ruhollah Khomeini, an exiled leader of clerical opposition to the Shah. Nonetheless, Saddam considered the 1975 Algiers Agreement to be merely a truce, rather than a definite settlement, and waited for an opportunity to contest it.

After the Iranian Revolution

Tensions between Iraq and Iran were fuelled by Iran's Islamic revolution and its appearance of being a Pan-Islamic force, in contrast to Iraq's Arab nationalism. Despite Iraq's goal of regaining the Shatt al-Arab, the Iraqi government initially seemed to welcome the Iranian Revolution, which overthrew Shah Mohammad Reza Pahlavi, who was seen as a common enemy. There were frequent clashes along the Iran–Iraq border throughout 1980, with Iraq publicly complaining of at least 544 incidents and Iran citing at least 797 violations of its border and airspace.

Ayatollah Ruhollah Khomeini called on Iraqis to overthrow the Ba'ath government, which was received with considerable anger in Baghdad. On 17 July 1979, despite Khomeini's call, Saddam gave a speech praising the Iranian Revolution and called for an Iraqi-Iranian friendship based on non-interference in each other's internal affairs. When Khomeini rejected Saddam's overture by calling for Islamic revolution in Iraq, Saddam was alarmed. Iran's new Islamic administration was regarded in Baghdad as an irrational, existential threat to the Ba'ath government, especially because the Ba'ath party, having a secular nature, discriminated against and posed a threat to the fundamentalist Shia movement in Iraq, whose clerics were Iran's allies within Iraq and whom Khomeini saw as oppressed.

Saddam's primary interest in war may have also stemmed from his desire to right the supposed "wrong" of the Algiers Agreement, in addition to finally achieving his desire of becoming the regional superpower. Saddam's goal was to supplant Egypt as the "leader of the Arab world" and to achieve hegemony over the Persian Gulf. He saw Iran's increased weakness due to revolution, sanctions, and international isolation. Saddam had invested heavily in Iraq's military since his defeat against Iran in 1975, buying large amounts of weaponry from the Soviet Union and France. Between 1973 and 1980 alone, Iraq purchased an estimated 1,600 tanks and APCs and over 200 Soviet-made aircraft. By 1980, Iraq possessed 242,000 soldiers (second only to Egypt in the Arab world), 2,350 tanks and 340 combat aircraft. Watching the disintegration of the powerful Iranian army that frustrated him in 1974–1975, he saw an opportunity to attack, using the threat of Islamic Revolution as a pretext. Iraqi military intelligence reported in July 1980 that despite Iran's bellicose rhetoric, "it is clear that, at present, Iran has no power to launch wide offensive operations against Iraq, or to defend on a large scale." Days before the Iraqi invasion and in the midst of rapidly escalating cross-border skirmishes, Iraqi military intelligence again reiterated on 14 September that "the enemy deployment organization does not indicate hostile intentions and appears to be taking on a more defensive mode."

Some scholars writing prior to the opening of formerly classified Iraqi archives, such as Alistair Finlan, argued that Saddam was drawn into a conflict with Iran due to the border clashes and Iranian meddling in Iraqi domestic affairs. Finlan stated in 2003 that the Iraqi invasion was meant to be a limited operation in order to send a political message to the Iranians to keep out of Iraqi domestic affairs, whereas Kevin M. Woods and Williamson Murray stated in 2014 that the balance of evidence suggests Saddam was seeking "a convenient excuse for war" in 1980.

On 8 March 1980, Iran announced it was withdrawing its ambassador from Iraq, downgraded its diplomatic ties to the charge d'affaires level, and demanded that Iraq do the same. The following day, Iraq declared Iran's ambassador persona non-grata, and demanded his withdrawal from Iraq by 15 March.

Iranian military preparations

In Iran, severe officer purges (including numerous executions ordered by Sadegh Khalkhali, the new Revolutionary Court judge), and shortages of spare parts for Iran's American and British-made equipment had crippled Iran's once-mighty military. Between February and September 1979, Iran's government executed 85 senior generals and forced all major-generals and most brigadier-generals into early retirement.

By September 1980, the revolutionary government had purged some 12,000 officers of all levels from the army. These purges resulted in a drastic decline in the Iranian military's operational capacities. 

On the eve of the revolution in 1978, international experts in military science had assessed that Iran's armed forces were the fifth most powerful in the world. However, by the eve of war with Iraq, the recently formidable Iranian army was in many crucial ways a shell of its former self, having been badly weakened by losses in experienced personal; the desertion rate had reached 60%, the officer corps was devastated and its most highly skilled soldiers and aviators had been exiled, imprisoned, or executed. When the invasion occurred, many pilots and officers were released from prison, or had their executions commuted to combat the Iraqis. However, throughout the war, Iran never managed to fully recover from this flight of human capital. Many junior officers were promoted to generals, resulting in the army being more integrated as a part of the regime by the war's end. Meanwhile, a new paramilitary organisation gained prominence in Iran, the Islamic Revolutionary Guard Corps. Created to protect the new regime and serve as a counterbalance to the army, the Revolutionary Guards, (IRGC) had been trained to act only as a militia and struggled to adapt as needed following the Iraqi invasion, initially refusing to fight alongside the regular army, resulting in many defeats. It was not until 1982, that the two groups began carrying out combined operations. 

An additional paramilitary militia was founded in response to the invasion, the "Army of 20 Million", commonly known as the Basij. The Basij were poorly armed and had members as young as 12 and as old as 70. They often acted in conjunction with the Revolutionary Guard, launching so-called human wave attacks and other campaigns against the Iraqis. They were subordinate to the Revolutionary Guards, and they made up most of the manpower that was used in the Revolutionary Guard's attacks.

Stephen Pelletiere wrote in his 1992 book The Iran–Iraq War: Chaos in a Vacuum:

Despite neglect by the new regime, at the outset of the conflict, Iran still had at least 1,000 operational tanks and several hundred functional aircraft and could cannibalize equipment to procure spare parts.  Continuous sanctions greatly limited Iran from acquiring many additional heavy weapons, including tanks and aircraft.

Iraqi military preparations

Iraq began planning offensives, confident that they would succeed. Iran lacked both cohesive leadership and spare parts for their American and British-made equipment. The Iraqis could mobilise up to 12 mechanised divisions, and morale was running high.

In addition, the area around the Shatt al-Arab posed no obstacle for the Iraqis, as they possessed river crossing equipment. Iraq correctly deduced that Iran's defences at the crossing points around the Karkheh and Karoun Rivers were undermanned and that the rivers could be easily crossed. Iraqi intelligence was also informed that the Iranian forces in Khuzestan Province (which consisted of two divisions prior to the revolution) now only consisted of several ill-equipped and under-strength battalions. Only a handful of company-sized tank units remained operational.

The only qualms the Iraqis had were over the Islamic Republic of Iran Air Force (formerly the Imperial Iranian Air Force). Despite the purge of several key pilots and commanders, as well as the lack of spare parts, the air force showed its power during local uprisings and rebellions. They were also active after the failed U.S. attempt to rescue its hostages, Operation Eagle Claw. Based on these observations, Iraq's leaders decided to carry out a surprise airstrike against the Iranian air force's infrastructure prior to the main invasion.

Border conflicts leading up to the war

The most important dispute was over the Shatt al-Arab waterway. Iran repudiated the demarcation line established in the Anglo-Ottoman Convention of Constantinople of November 1913. Iran asked the border to run along the thalweg, the deepest point of the navigable channel. Iraq, encouraged by Britain, took Iran to the League of Nations in 1934, but their disagreement was not resolved. Finally in 1937 Iran and Iraq signed their first boundary treaty. The treaty established the waterway border on the eastern bank of the river except for a  anchorage zone near Abadan, which was allotted to Iran and where the border ran along the thalweg. Iran sent a delegation to Iraq soon after the Ba'ath coup in 1969 and, when Iraq refused to proceed with negotiations over a new treaty, the treaty of 1937 was withdrawn by Iran. The Iranian abrogation of the 1937 treaty marked the beginning of a period of acute Iraqi-Iranian tension that was to last until the Algiers Accords of 1975.

The 1974–75 Shatt al-Arab clashes were a previous Iranian-Iraqi standoff in the region of the Shatt al-Arab waterway during the mid-1970s. Nearly 1,000 were killed in the clashes. It was the most significant dispute over the Shatt al-Arab waterway in modern times, prior to the Iran–Iraq War.

On 10 September 1980, Iraq forcibly reclaimed territories in Zain al-Qaws and Saif Saad that it had been promised under the terms of the 1975 Algiers Agreement but that Iran had never handed over, leading to both Iran and Iraq declaring the treaty null and void, on 14 September and 17 September, respectively. As a result, the only outstanding border dispute between Iran and Iraq at the time of the Iraqi invasion of 22 September was the question of whether Iranian ships would fly Iraqi flags and pay Iraq navigation fees for a stretch of the Shatt al-Arab river spanning several miles.

Course of the war

1980: Iraqi invasion

Iraq launched a full-scale invasion of Iran on 22 September 1980. The Iraqi Air Force launched surprise air strikes on ten Iranian airfields with the objective of destroying the Iranian Air Force. The attack failed to damage the Iranian Air Force significantly; it damaged some of Iran's airbase infrastructure, but failed to destroy a significant number of aircraft. The Iraqi Air Force was only able to strike in depth with a few MiG-23BN, Tu-22, and Su-20 aircraft, and Iran had built hardened aircraft shelters where most of its combat aircraft were stored.

The invasion's purpose, according to Saddam, was to blunt the edge of Khomeini's movement and to thwart his attempts to export his Islamic revolution to Iraq and the Persian Gulf states. Saddam hoped an attack on Iran would cause such a blow to Iran's prestige that it would lead to the new government's downfall, or at least end Iran's calls for his overthrow.

Of Iraq's six divisions that invaded by ground, four were sent to Khuzestan, which was located near the border's southern end, to cut off the Shatt al-Arab from the rest of Iran and to establish a territorial security zone. The other two divisions invaded across the northern and central part of the border to prevent an Iranian counter-attack. Two of the four Iraqi divisions, one mechanised and one armoured, operated near the southern end and began a siege of the strategically important port cities of Abadan and Khorramshahr.

The two armoured divisions secured the territory bounded by the cities of Khorramshahr, Ahvaz, Susangerd, and Musian. On the central front, the Iraqis occupied Mehran, advanced towards the foothills of the Zagros Mountains, and were able to block the traditional Tehran–Baghdad invasion route by securing territory forward of Qasr-e Shirin, Iran. On the northern front, the Iraqis attempted to establish a strong defensive position opposite Suleimaniya to protect the Iraqi Kirkuk oil complex. Iraqi hopes of an uprising by the ethnic Arabs of Khuzestan failed to materialise, as most of the ethnic Arabs remained loyal to Iran. The Iraqi troops advancing into Iran in 1980 were described by Patrick Brogan as "badly led and lacking in offensive spirit". The first known chemical weapons attack by Iraq on Iran probably took place during the fighting around Susangerd.

Though the Iraqi air invasion surprised the Iranians, the Iranian air force retaliated the day after with a large-scale attack against Iraqi air bases and infrastructure in Operation Kaman 99. Groups of F-4 Phantom and F-5 Tiger fighter jets attacked targets throughout Iraq, such as oil facilities, dams, petrochemical plants, and oil refineries, and included Mosul Airbase, Baghdad, and the Kirkuk oil refinery. Iraq was taken by surprise at the strength of the retaliation, which caused the Iraqis heavy losses and economic disruption, but the Iranians took heavy losses as well as losing many aircraft and aircrews to Iraqi air defenses.

Iranian Army Aviation's AH-1 Cobra helicopter gunships began attacks on the advancing Iraqi divisions, along with F-4 Phantoms armed with AGM-65 Maverick missiles; they destroyed numerous armoured vehicles and impeded the Iraqi advance, though not completely halting it. Meanwhile, Iraqi air attacks on Iran were repelled by Iran's F-14A Tomcat interceptor fighter jets, using AIM-54A Phoenix missiles, which downed a dozen of Iraq's Soviet-built fighters in the first two days of battle. 

The Iranian regular military, police forces, volunteer Basij, and Revolutionary Guards all conducted their operations separately; thus, the Iraqi invading forces did not face coordinated resistance. However, on 24 September, the Iranian Navy attacked Basra, Iraq, destroying two oil terminals near the Iraqi port Al-Faw, which reduced Iraq's ability to export oil. The Iranian ground forces (primarily consisting of the Revolutionary Guard) retreated to the cities, where they set up defences against the invaders.

On 30 September, Iran's air force launched Operation Scorch Sword, striking and badly damaging the nearly-complete Osirak Nuclear Reactor near Baghdad. By 1 October, Baghdad had been subjected to eight air attacks. In response, Iraq launched aerial strikes against Iranian targets.

The mountainous border between Iran and Iraq made a deep ground invasion almost impossible, and air strikes were used instead. The invasion's first waves were a series of air strikes targeted at Iranian airfields. Iraq also attempted to bomb Tehran, Iran's capital and command centre, into submission.

First Battle of Khorramshahr

On 22 September, a prolonged battle began in the city of Khorramshahr, eventually leaving around 7,000 dead on each side. Reflecting the bloody nature of the struggle, Iranians came to call Khorramshahr "City of Blood".

The battle began with Iraqi air raids against key points and mechanised divisions advancing on the city in a crescent-like formation. They were slowed by Iranian air attacks and Revolutionary Guard troops with recoilless rifles, rocket-propelled grenades, and Molotov cocktails. The Iranians flooded the marsh areas around the city, forcing the Iraqis to traverse through narrow strips of land. Iraqi tanks launched attacks with no infantry support, and many tanks were lost to Iranian anti-tank teams. However, by 30 September, the Iraqis had managed to clear the Iranians from the outskirts of the city. The next day, the Iraqis launched infantry and armoured attacks into the city. After heavy house-to-house fighting, the Iraqis were repelled. On 14 October, the Iraqis launched a second offensive. The Iranians initiated a controlled withdrawal from the city, street by street. By 24 October, most of the city was captured, and the Iranians evacuated across the Karun River. Some partisans remained, and fighting continued until 10 November.

Iraqi advance stalls

The people of Iran, rather than turning against their still-weak Islamic Republic, rallied around their country. An estimated 200,000 fresh troops had arrived at the front by November, many of them ideologically committed volunteers.

Though Khorramshahr was finally captured, the battle had delayed the Iraqis enough to allow the large-scale deployment of the Iranian military. In November, Saddam ordered his forces to advance towards Dezful and Ahvaz, and lay sieges to both cities. However, the Iraqi offensive had been badly damaged by Iranian militias and air power. Iran's air force had destroyed Iraq's army supply depots and fuel supplies, and was strangling the country through an aerial siege. Iran's supplies had not been exhausted, despite sanctions, and the military often cannibalised spare parts from other equipment and began searching for parts on the black market. On 28 November, Iran launched Operation Morvarid (Pearl), a combined air and sea attack which destroyed 80% of Iraq's navy and all of its radar sites in the southern portion of the country. When Iraq laid siege to Abadan and dug its troops in around the city, it was unable to blockade the port, which allowed Iran to resupply Abadan by sea.

Iraq's strategic reserves had been depleted, and by now it lacked the power to go on any major offensives until nearly the end of the war. On 7 December, Hussein announced that Iraq was going on the defensive. By the end of 1980, Iraq had destroyed about 500 Western-built Iranian tanks and captured 100 others.

1981: Stalemate

For the next eight months, both sides were on a defensive footing (with the exception of the Battle of Dezful), as the Iranians needed more time to reorganise their forces after the damage inflicted by the purge of 1979–80. During this period, fighting consisted mainly of artillery duels and raids. Iraq had mobilised 21 divisions for the invasion, while Iran countered with only 13 regular army divisions and one brigade. Of the regular divisions, only seven were deployed to the border. The war bogged down into World War I-style trench warfare with tanks and modern late-20th century weapons. Due to the power of anti-tank weapons such as the RPG-7, armored manoeuvre by the Iraqis was very costly, and they consequently entrenched their tanks into static positions.

Iraq also began firing Scud missiles into Dezful and Ahvaz, and used terror bombing to bring the war to the Iranian civilian population. Iran launched dozens of "human wave assaults".

Battle of Dezful

On 5 January 1981, Iran had reorganised its forces enough to launch a large-scale offensive, Operation Nasr (Victory). The Iranians launched their major armoured offensive from Dezful in the direction of Susangerd, consisting of tank brigades from the 16th Qazvin, 77th Khorasan, and 92nd Khuzestan Armoured Divisions, and broke through Iraqi lines. However, the Iranian tanks had raced through Iraqi lines with their flanks unprotected and with no infantry support; as a result, they were cut off by Iraqi tanks. In the ensuing Battle of Dezful, the Iranian armoured divisions were nearly wiped out in one of the biggest tank battles of the war. When the Iranian tanks tried to manoeuvre, they became stuck in the mud of the marshes, and many tanks were abandoned. The Iraqis lost 45 T-55 and T-62 tanks, while the Iranians lost 100–200 Chieftain and M-60 tanks. Reporters counted roughly 150 destroyed or deserted Iranian tanks, and also 40 Iraqi tanks. 141 Iranians were killed during the battle.

The battle had been ordered by Iranian president Abulhassan Banisadr, who was hoping that a victory might shore up his deteriorating political position; instead, the failure hastened his fall. Many of Iran's problems took place because of political infighting between President Banisadr, who supported the regular army, and the hardliners who supported the IRGC. Once he was impeached and the competition ended, the performance of the Iranian military improved.
 
The Islamic Republic government in Iran was further distracted by internal fighting between the regime and the Mujahedin e-Khalq (MEK) on the streets of Iran's major cities in June 1981 and again in September. In 1983, the MEK started an alliance with Iraq following a meeting between MEK leader Massoud Rajavi and Iraqi Deputy Prime minister Tariq Aziz.

In 1984 Banisadr left the coalition because of a dispute with Rajavi. In 1986, Rajavi moved from Paris to Iraq and set up a base on the Iranian border. The Battle of Dezful became a critical battle in Iranian military thinking. Less emphasis was placed on the Army with its conventional tactics, and more emphasis was placed on the Revolutionary Guard with its unconventional tactics.

Attack on H3

The Iraqi Air Force, badly damaged by the Iranians, was moved to the H-3 Airbase in Western Iraq, near the Jordanian border and away from Iran. However, on 3 April 1981, the Iranian air force used eight F-4 Phantom fighter bombers, four F-14 Tomcats, three Boeing 707 refuelling tankers, and one Boeing 747 command plane to launch a surprise attack on H3, destroying 27–50 Iraqi fighter jets and bombers.

Despite the successful H-3 airbase attack (in addition to other air attacks), the Iranian Air Force was forced to cancel its successful 180-day air offensive. In addition, they abandoned their attempted control of Iranian airspace. They had been seriously weakened by sanctions and pre-war purges and further damaged by a fresh purge after the impeachment crisis of President Banisadr. The Iranian Air Force could not survive further attrition, and decided to limit their losses, abandoning efforts to control Iranian airspace. The Iranian air force would henceforth fight on the defensive, trying to deter the Iraqis rather than engaging them. While throughout 1981–1982 the Iraqi air force would remain weak, within the next few years they would rearm and expand again, and begin to regain the strategic initiative.

Introduction of the human wave attack

The Iranians suffered from a shortage of heavy weapons, but had a large number of devoted volunteer troops, so they began using human wave attacks against the Iraqis. Typically, an Iranian assault would commence with poorly trained Basij who would launch the primary human wave assaults to swamp the weakest portions of the Iraqi lines en masse (on some occasions even bodily clearing minefields). This would be followed up by the more experienced Revolutionary Guard infantry, who would breach the weakened Iraqi lines, and followed up by the regular army using mechanized forces, who would maneuver through the breach and attempt to encircle and defeat the enemy.

According to historian Stephen C. Pelletiere, the idea of Iranian "human wave attacks" was a misconception. Instead, the Iranian tactics consisted of using groups of 22-man infantry squads, which moved forward to attack specific objectives. As the squads surged forward to execute their missions, that gave the impression of a "human wave attack". Nevertheless, the idea of "human wave attacks" remained virtually synonymous with any large-scale infantry frontal assault Iran carried out. Large numbers of troops would be used, aimed at overwhelming the Iraqi lines (usually the weakest portion, typically manned by the Iraqi Popular Army), regardless of losses.

According to the former Iraqi general Ra'ad al-Hamdani, the Iranian human wave charges consisted of armed "civilians" who carried most of their necessary equipment themselves into battle and often lacked command and control and logistics. Operations were often carried out during the night and deception operations, infiltrations, and maneuvers became more common. The Iranians would also reinforce the infiltrating forces with new units to keep up their momentum. Once a weak point was found, the Iranians would concentrate all of their forces into that area in an attempt to break through with human wave attacks.

The human wave attacks, while extremely bloody (tens of thousands of troops died in the process), when used in combination with infiltration and surprise, caused major Iraqi defeats. As the Iraqis would dig in their tanks and infantry into static, entrenched positions, the Iranians would manage to break through the lines and encircle entire divisions. Merely the fact that the Iranian forces used maneuver warfare by their light infantry against static Iraqi defenses was often the decisive factor in battle. However, lack of coordination between the Iranian Army and IRGC and shortages of heavy weaponry played a detrimental role, often with most of the infantry not being supported by artillery and armor.

Operation-eighth Imam

After the Iraqi offensive stalled in March 1981, there was little change in the front other than Iran retaking the high ground above Susangerd in May. By late 1981, Iran returned to the offensive and launched a new operation (Operation Samen-ol-A'emeh (The Eighth Imam)), ending the Iraqi Siege of Abadan on 27–29 September 1981. The Iranians used a combined force of regular army artillery with small groups of armor, supported by Pasdaran (IRGC) and Basij infantry. On 15 October, after breaking the siege, a large Iranian convoy was ambushed by Iraqi tanks, and during the ensuing tank battle Iran lost 20 Chieftains and other armored vehicles and withdrew from the previously gained territory.

Operation Tariq al-Qods
On 29 November 1981, Iran began Operation Tariq al-Qods with three army brigades and seven Revolutionary Guard brigades. The Iraqis failed to properly patrol their occupied areas, and the Iranians constructed a  road through the unguarded sand dunes, launching their attack from the Iraqi rear. The town of Bostan was retaken from Iraqi divisions by 7 December. By this time the Iraqi Army was experiencing serious morale problems, compounded by the fact that Operation Tariq al-Qods marked the first use of Iranian "human wave" tactics, where the Revolutionary Guard light infantry repeatedly charged at Iraqi positions, oftentimes without the support of armour or air power. The fall of Bostan exacerbated the Iraqis' logistical problems, forcing them to use a roundabout route from Ahvaz to the south to resupply their troops. 6,000 Iranians and over 2,000 Iraqis were killed in the operation.

1982: Iraqi retreat, Iranian offensive

The Iraqis, realising that the Iranians were planning to attack, decided to preempt them with Operation al-Fawz al-'Azim (Supreme Success) on 19 March. Using a large number of tanks, helicopters, and fighter jets, they attacked the Iranian buildup around the Roghabiyeh pass. Though Saddam and his generals assumed they had succeeded, in reality the Iranian forces remained fully intact. The Iranians had concentrated much of their forces by bringing them directly from the cities and towns throughout Iran via trains, buses, and private cars. The concentration of forces did not resemble a traditional military buildup, and although the Iraqis detected a population buildup near the front, they failed to realize that this was an attacking force. As a result, Saddam's army was unprepared for the Iranian offensives to come.

Operation Undeniable Victory

Iran's next major offensive, led by then Colonel Ali Sayad Shirazi, was Operation Undeniable Victory. On 22 March 1982, Iran launched an attack which took the Iraqi forces by surprise: using Chinook helicopters, they landed behind Iraqi lines, silenced their artillery, and captured an Iraqi headquarters. The Iranian Basij then launched "human wave" attacks, consisting of 1,000 fighters per wave. Though they took heavy losses, they eventually broke through Iraqi lines.

The Revolutionary Guard and regular army followed up by surrounding the Iraqi 9th and 10th Armoured and 1st Mechanised Divisions that had camped close to the Iranian town of Shush. The Iraqis launched a counter-attack using their 12th Armoured division to break the encirclement and rescue the surrounded divisions. Iraqi tanks came under attack by 95 Iranian F-4 Phantom and F-5 Tiger fighter jets, destroying much of the division.

Operation Undeniable Victory was an Iranian victory; Iraqi forces were driven away from Shush, Dezful and Ahvaz. The Iranian armed forces destroyed 320–400 Iraqi tanks and armored vehicles in a costly success. In just the first day of the battle, the Iranians lost 196 tanks. By this time, most of the Khuzestan province had been recaptured.

Operation Beit ol-Moqaddas

In preparation for Operation Beit ol-Moqaddas, the Iranians had launched numerous air raids against Iraq air bases, destroying 47 jets (including Iraq's brand new Mirage F-1 fighter jets from France); this gave the Iranians air superiority over the battlefield while allowing them to monitor Iraqi troop movements.

On 29 April, Iran launched the offensive. 70,000 Revolutionary Guard and Basij members struck on several axes—Bostan, Susangerd, the west bank of the Karun River, and Ahvaz. The Basij launched human wave attacks, which were followed up by the regular army and Revolutionary Guard support along with tanks and helicopters. Under heavy Iranian pressure, the Iraqi forces retreated. By 12 May, Iran had driven out all Iraqi forces from the Susangerd area. The Iranians captured several thousand Iraqi troops and a large number of tanks. Nevertheless, the Iranians took many losses as well, especially among the Basij.

The Iraqis retreated to the Karun River, with only Khorramshahr and a few outlying areas remaining in their possession. Saddam ordered 70,000 troops to be placed around the city of Khorramshahr. The Iraqis created a hastily constructed defence line around the city and outlying areas. To discourage airborne commando landings, the Iraqis also placed metal spikes and destroyed cars in areas likely to be used as troop landing zones. Saddam Hussein even visited Khorramshahr in a dramatic gesture, swearing that the city would never be relinquished. However, Khorramshahr's only resupply point was across the Shatt al-Arab, and the Iranian air force began bombing the supply bridges to the city, while their artillery zeroed in on the besieged garrison.

Second Battle of Khorramshahr

In the early morning hours of 23 May 1982, the Iranians began the drive towards Khorramshahr across the Karun River. This part of Operation Beit ol-Moqaddas was spearheaded by the 77th Khorasan division with tanks along with the Revolutionary Guard and Basij. The Iranians hit the Iraqis with destructive air strikes and massive artillery barrages, crossed the Karun River, captured bridgeheads, and launched human wave attacks towards the city. Saddam's defensive barricade collapsed; in less than 48 hours of fighting, the city fell and 19,000 Iraqis surrendered to the Iranians. A total of 10,000 Iraqis were killed or wounded in Khorramshahr, while the Iranians suffered 30,000 casualties. During the whole of Operation Beit ol-Moqaddas, 33,000 Iraqi soldiers were captured by the Iranians.

State of Iraqi armed forces

The fighting had battered the Iraqi military: its strength fell from 210,000 to 150,000 troops; over 20,000 Iraqi soldiers were killed and over 30,000 captured; two out of four active armoured divisions and at least three mechanised divisions fell to less than a brigade's strength; and the Iranians had captured over 450 tanks and armoured personnel carriers.

The Iraqi Air Force was also left in poor shape: after losing up to 55 aircraft since early December 1981, they had only 100 intact fighter-bombers and interceptors. A defector who flew his MiG-21 to Syria in June 1982 revealed that the Iraqi Air Force had only three squadrons of fighter-bombers capable of mounting operations into Iran. The Iraqi Army Air Corps was in slightly better shape, and could still operate more than 70 helicopters. Despite this, the Iraqis still held 3,000 tanks, while Iran held 1,000.

At this point, Saddam believed that his army was too demoralised and damaged to hold onto Khuzestan and major swathes of Iranian territory, and withdrew his remaining forces, redeploying them in defence along the border. However, his troops continued to occupy some key Iranian border areas of Iran, including the disputed territories that prompted his invasion, notably the Shatt al-Arab waterway. In response to their failures against the Iranians in Khorramshahr, Saddam ordered the executions of Generals Juwad Shitnah and Salah al-Qadhi and Colonels Masa and al-Jalil. At least a dozen other high-ranking officers were also executed during this time. This became an increasingly common punishment for those who failed him in battle.

Early international response

In April 1982, the rival Ba'athist regime in Syria, one of the few nations that supported Iran, closed the Kirkuk–Baniyas pipeline that had allowed Iraqi oil to reach tankers on the Mediterranean, reducing the Iraqi budget by $5 billion per month. Journalist Patrick Brogan wrote, "It appeared for a while that Iraq would be strangled economically before it was defeated militarily." Syria's closure of the Kirkuk–Baniyas pipeline left Iraq with the pipeline to Turkey as the only means of exporting oil, along with transporting oil by tanker truck to the port of Aqaba in Jordan. However, the Turkish pipeline had a capacity of only , which was insufficient to pay for the war. However, Saudi Arabia, Kuwait, and the other Gulf states saved Iraq from bankruptcy by providing it with an average of $60 billion in subsidies per year. Though Iraq had previously been hostile towards other Gulf states, "the threat of Persian fundamentalism was far more feared." They were especially inclined to fear Iranian victory after Ayatollah Khomeini declared monarchies to be illegitimate and an un-Islamic form of government. Khomeini's statement was widely received as a call to overthrow the Gulf monarchies. Journalists John Bulloch and Harvey Morris wrote:

The virulent Iranian campaign, which at its peak seemed to be making the overthrow of the Saudi regime a war aim on a par with the defeat of Iraq, did have an effect on the Kingdom [of Saudi Arabia], but not the one the Iranians wanted: instead of becoming more conciliatory, the Saudis became tougher, more self-confident, and less prone to seek compromise.

Saudi Arabia was said to provide Iraq with $1 billion per month starting in mid-1982.

Iraq began receiving support from the United States and west European countries as well. Saddam was given diplomatic, monetary, and military support by the United States, including massive loans, political influence, and intelligence on Iranian deployments gathered by American spy satellites. The Iraqis relied heavily on American satellite footage and radar planes to detect Iranian troop movements, and they enabled Iraq to move troops to the site before the battle.

With Iranian success on the battlefield, the United States increased its support of the Iraqi government, supplying intelligence, economic aid, and dual-use equipment and vehicles, as well as normalizing its intergovernmental relations (which had been broken during the 1967 Six-Day War). President Ronald Reagan decided that the United States "could not afford to allow Iraq to lose the war to Iran", and that the United States "would do whatever was necessary to prevent Iraq from losing". In March 1982, Reagan signed National Security Study Memorandum (NSSM) 4-82—seeking "a review of U.S. policy toward the Middle East"—and in June Reagan signed a National Security Decision Directive (NSDD) co-written by NSC official Howard Teicher, which determined: "The United States could not afford to allow Iraq to lose the war to Iran."

In 1982, Reagan removed Iraq from the list of countries "supporting terrorism" and sold weapons such as howitzers to Iraq via Jordan. France sold Iraq millions of dollars worth of weapons, including Gazelle helicopters, Mirage F-1 fighters, and Exocet missiles. Both the United States and West Germany sold Iraq dual-use pesticides and poisons that would be used to create chemical weapons and other weapons, such as Roland missiles.

At the same time, the Soviet Union, angered with Iran for purging and destroying the communist Tudeh Party, sent large shipments of weapons to Iraq. The Iraqi Air Force was replenished with Soviet, Chinese, and French fighter jets and attack/transport helicopters. Iraq also replenished their stocks of small arms and anti-tank weapons such as AK-47s and rocket-propelled grenades from its supporters. The depleted tank forces were replenished with more Soviet and Chinese tanks, and the Iraqis were reinvigorated in the face of the coming Iranian onslaught. Iran was portrayed as the aggressor, and would be seen as such until the 1990–1991 Persian Gulf War, when Iraq would be condemned.

Iran did not have the money to purchase arms to the same extent as Iraq did. They counted on China, North Korea, Libya, Syria, and Japan for supplying anything from weapons and munitions to logistical and engineering equipment.

Ceasefire proposal

On 20 June 1982, Saddam announced that he wanted to sue for peace and proposed an immediate ceasefire and withdrawal from Iranian territory within two weeks. Khomeini responded by saying the war would not end until a new government was installed in Iraq and reparations paid. He proclaimed that Iran would invade Iraq and would not stop until the Ba'ath regime was replaced by an Islamic republic. Iran supported a government in exile for Iraq, the Supreme Council of the Islamic Revolution in Iraq, led by exiled Iraqi cleric Mohammad Baqer al-Hakim, which was dedicated to overthrowing the Ba'ath party. They recruited POWs, dissidents, exiles, and Shias to join the Badr Brigade, the military wing of the organisation.

The decision to invade Iraq was taken after much debate within the Iranian government. One faction, comprising Prime Minister Mir-Hossein Mousavi, Foreign Minister Ali Akbar Velayati, President Ali Khamenei, Army Chief of Staff General Ali Sayad Shirazi as well as Major General Qasem-Ali Zahirnejad, wanted to accept the ceasefire, as most of Iranian soil had been recaptured. In particular, General Shirazi and Zahirnejad were both opposed to the invasion of Iraq on logistical grounds, and stated they would consider resigning if "unqualified people continued to meddle with the conduct of the war". Of the opposing view was a hardline faction led by the clerics on the Supreme Defence Council, whose leader was the politically powerful speaker of the Majlis, Akbar Hashemi Rafsanjani.

Iran also hoped that its attacks would ignite a revolt against Saddam's rule by the Shia and Kurdish population of Iraq, possibly resulting in his downfall. It was successful in doing so with the Kurdish population, but not the Shia. Iran had captured large quantities of Iraqi equipment (enough to create several tank battalions, Iran once again had 1,000 tanks) and also managed to clandestinely procure spare parts as well, including those pertaining to the F-14 Tomcat.

At a cabinet meeting in Baghdad, Minister of Health Riyadh Ibrahim Hussein suggested that Saddam could step down temporarily as a way of easing Iran towards a ceasefire, and then afterwards would come back to power. Saddam, annoyed, asked if anyone else in the Cabinet agreed with the Health Minister's idea. When no one raised their hand in support, he escorted Riyadh Hussein to the next room, closed the door, and shot him with his pistol. Saddam returned to the room and continued with his meeting.

Iran invades Iraq and Iraqi tactics in response

For the most part, Iraq remained on the defensive for the next five years, unable and unwilling to launch any major offensives, while Iran launched more than 70 offensives. Iraq's strategy changed from holding territory in Iran to denying Iran any major gains in Iraq (as well as holding onto disputed territories along the border). Saddam commenced a policy of total war, gearing most of his country towards defending against Iran. By 1988, Iraq was spending 40–75% of its GDP on military equipment. Saddam had also more than doubled the size of the Iraqi army, from 200,000 soldiers (12 divisions and three independent brigades) to 500,000 (23 divisions and nine brigades). Iraq also began launching air raids against Iranian border cities, greatly increasing the practice by 1984. By the end of 1982, Iraq had been resupplied with new Soviet and Chinese materiel, and the ground war entered a new phase. Iraq used newly acquired T-55, T-62 and T-72 tanks (as well as Chinese copies), BM-21 truck-mounted rocket launchers, and Mi-24 helicopter gunships to prepare a Soviet-type three-line defence, replete with obstacles such as barbed wire, minefields, fortified positions and bunkers. The Combat Engineer Corps built bridges across water obstacles, laid minefields, erected earthen revetments, dug trenches, built machine gun nests, and prepared new defence lines and fortifications.

Iraq began to focus on using defense in depth to defeat the Iranians. Iraq created multiple static defense lines to bleed the Iranians through sheer size. When faced against large Iranian attack, where human waves would overrun Iraq's forward entrenched infantry defences, the Iraqis would often retreat, but their static defences would bleed the Iranians and channel them into certain directions, drawing them into traps or pockets. Iraqi air and artillery attacks would then pin the Iranians down, while tanks and mechanised infantry attacks using mobile warfare would push them back. Sometimes, the Iraqis would launch "probing attacks" into the Iranian lines to provoke them into launching their attacks sooner. While Iranian human wave attacks were successful against the dug in Iraqi forces in Khuzestan, they had trouble breaking through Iraq's defense in depth lines. Iraq had a logistical advantage in their defence: the front was located near the main Iraqi bases and arms depots, allowing their army to be efficiently supplied. By contrast, the front in Iran was a considerable distance away from the main Iranian bases and arms depots, and as such, Iranian troops and supplies had to travel through mountain ranges before arriving at the front.

In addition, Iran's military power was weakened once again by large purges in 1982, resulting from another supposedly attempted coup.

Operation Ramadan (First Battle of Basra)

The Iranian generals wanted to launch an all-out attack on Baghdad and seize it before the weapon shortages continued to manifest further. Instead, that was rejected as being unfeasible, and the decision was made to capture one area of Iraq after the other in the hopes that a series of blows delivered foremost by the Revolutionary Guards Corps would force a political solution to the war (including Iraq withdrawing completely from the disputed territories along the border).

The Iranians planned their attack in southern Iraq, near Basra. Called Operation Ramadan, it involved over 180,000 troops from both sides, and was one of the largest land battles since World War II. Iranian strategy dictated that they launch their primary attack on the weakest point of the Iraqi lines; however, the Iraqis were informed of Iran's battle plans and moved all of their forces to the area the Iranians planned to attack. The Iraqis were equipped with tear gas to use against the enemy, which would be the first major use of chemical warfare during the conflict, throwing an entire attacking division into chaos.

Over 100,000 Revolutionary Guards and Basij volunteer forces charged towards the Iraqi lines. The Iraqi troops had entrenched themselves in formidable defenses, and had set up a network of bunkers and artillery positions. The Basij used human waves, and were even used to bodily clear the Iraqi minefields and allow the Revolutionary Guards to advance. Combatants came so close to one another that Iranians were able to board Iraqi tanks and throw grenades inside the hulls. By the eighth day, the Iranians had gained  inside Iraq and had taken several causeways. Iran's Revolutionary Guards also used the T-55 tanks they had captured in earlier battles.

However, the attacks came to a halt and the Iranians turned to defensive measures. Seeing this, Iraq used their Mi-25 helicopters, along with Gazelle helicopters armed with Euromissile HOT, against columns of Iranian mechanised infantry and tanks. These "hunter-killer" teams of helicopters, which had been formed with the help of East German advisors, proved to be very costly for the Iranians. Aerial dogfights occurred between Iraqi MiGs and Iranian F-4 Phantoms.

On 16 July, Iran tried again further north and managed to push the Iraqis back. However, only  from Basra, the poorly equipped Iranian forces were surrounded on three sides by Iraqis with heavy weaponry. Some were captured, while many were killed. Only a last-minute attack by Iranian AH-1 Cobra helicopters stopped the Iraqis from routing the Iranians. Three more similar attacks occurred around the Khorramshahr-Baghdad road area towards the end of the month, but none were significantly successful. Iraq had concentrated three armoured divisions, the 3rd, 9th, and 10th, as a counter-attack force to attack any penetrations. They were successful in defeating the Iranian breakthroughs, but suffered heavy losses. The 9th Armoured Division in particular had to be disbanded, and was never reformed. The total casualty toll had grown to include 80,000 soldiers and civilians. 400 Iranian tanks and armored vehicles were destroyed or abandoned, while Iraq lost no fewer than 370 tanks.

Final operations of 1982

After Iran's failure in Operation Ramadan, they carried out only a few smaller attacks. Iran launched two limited offensives aimed at reclaiming the Sumar Hills and isolating the Iraqi pocket at Naft shahr at the international border, both of which were part of the disputed territories still under Iraqi occupation. They then aimed to capture the Iraqi border town of Mandali. They planned to take the Iraqis by surprise using Basij militiamen, army helicopters, and some armoured forces, then stretch their defences and possibly break through them to open a road to Baghdad for future exploitation. During Operation Muslim ibn Aqil (1–7 October), Iran recovered  of disputed territory straddling the international border and reached the outskirts of Mandali before being stopped by Iraqi helicopter and armoured attacks. During Operation Muharram (1–21 November), the Iranians captured part of the Bayat oilfield with the help of their fighter jets and helicopters, destroying 105 Iraqi tanks, 70 APCs, and 7 planes with few losses. They nearly breached the Iraqi lines but failed to capture Mandali after the Iraqis sent reinforcements, including brand new T-72 tanks, which possessed armour that could not be pierced from the front by Iranian TOW missiles. The Iranian advance was also impeded by heavy rains. 3,500 Iraqis and an unknown number of Iranians died, with only minor gains for Iran.

1983–84: Stalemate and war of attrition

After the failure of the 1982 summer offensives, Iran believed that a major effort along the entire breadth of the front would yield victory. During the course of 1983, the Iranians launched five major assaults along the front, though none achieved substantial success, as the Iranians staged more massive "human wave" attacks. By this time, it was estimated that no more than 70 Iranian fighter aircraft were still operational at any given time; Iran had its own helicopter repair facilities, left over from before the revolution, and thus often used helicopters for close air support. Iranian fighter pilots had superior training compared to their Iraqi counterparts (as most had received training from US officers before the 1979 revolution) and would continue to dominate in combat. However, aircraft shortages, the size of defended territory/airspace, and American intelligence supplied to Iraq allowed the Iraqis to exploit gaps in Iranian airspace. Iraqi air campaigns met little opposition, striking over half of Iran, as the Iraqis were able to gain air superiority towards the end of the war.

Operation Before the Dawn
In Operation Before the Dawn, launched 6 February 1983, the Iranians shifted focus from the southern to the central and northern sectors. Iran directed artillery on Basra, Al Amarah, and Mandali.

The Iranians suffered a large number of casualties clearing minefields and breaching Iraqi anti-tank mines, which Iraqi engineers were unable to replace. After this battle, Iran reduced its use of human wave attacks, though they still remained a key tactic as the war went on.

Further Iranian attacks were mounted in the Mandali–Baghdad north-central sector in April 1983, but were repelled by Iraqi mechanised and infantry divisions. Casualties were high, and by the end of 1983, an estimated 120,000 Iranians and 60,000 Iraqis had been killed. Iran, however, held the advantage in the war of attrition; in 1983, Iran had an estimated population of 43.6 million to Iraq's 14.8 million, and the discrepancy continued to grow throughout the war.

Dawn Operations
From early 1983–1984, Iran launched a series of four Valfajr (Dawn) Operations (that eventually numbered to 10). During Operation Dawn-1, in early February 1983, 50,000 Iranian forces attacked westward from Dezful and were confronted by 55,000 Iraqi forces. The Iranian objective was to cut off the road from Basra to Baghdad in the central sector. The Iraqis carried out 150 air sorties against the Iranians, and even bombed Dezful, Ahvaz, and Khorramshahr in retribution. The Iraqi counterattack was broken up by Iran's 92nd Armoured Division.

During Operation Dawn-2, the Iranians directed insurgency operations by proxy in April 1983 by supporting the Kurds in the north. With Kurdish support, the Iranians attacked on 23 July 1983, capturing the Iraqi town of Haj Omran and maintaining it against an Iraqi poison gas counteroffensive. This operation incited Iraq to later conduct indiscriminate chemical attacks against the Kurds. The Iranians attempted to further exploit activities in the north on 30 July 1983, during Operation Dawn-3. Iran saw an opportunity to sweep away Iraqi forces controlling the roads between the Iranian mountain border towns of Mehran, Dehloran and Elam. Iraq launched airstrikes, and equipped attack helicopters with chemical warheads; while ineffective, it demonstrated both the Iraqi general staff's and Saddam's increasing interest in using chemical weapons. In the end, 17,000 had been killed on both sides, with no gain for either country.

The focus of Operation Dawn-4 in September 1983 was the northern sector in Iranian Kurdistan. Three Iranian regular divisions, the Revolutionary Guard, and Kurdistan Democratic Party (KDP) elements amassed in Marivan and Sardasht in a move to threaten the major Iraqi city Suleimaniyah. To stem the tide, Iraq deployed Mi-8 attack helicopters equipped with chemical weapons and executed 120 sorties against the Iranian force, which stopped them  into Iraqi territory. 5,000 Iranians and 2,500 Iraqis died. Iran gained  of its territory back in the north, gained  of Iraqi land, and captured 1,800 Iraqi prisoners while Iraq abandoned large quantities of valuable weapons and war materiel in the field. Iraq responded to these losses by firing a series of SCUD-B missiles into the cities of Dezful, Masjid Soleiman, and Behbehan. Iran's use of artillery against Basra while the battles in the north raged created multiple fronts, which effectively confused and wore down Iraq.

Iran's change in tactics
Previously, the Iranians had outnumbered the Iraqis on the battlefield, but Iraq expanded their military draft (pursuing a policy of total war), and by 1984, the armies were equal in size. By 1986, Iraq had twice as many soldiers as Iran. By 1988, Iraq would have 1 million soldiers, giving it the fourth largest army in the world. Some of its equipment, such as tanks, outnumbered Iran's by at least five to one. Iranian commanders, however, remained more tactically skilled.

After the Dawn Operations, Iran attempted to change tactics. In the face of increasing Iraqi defense in depth, as well as increased armaments and manpower, Iran could no longer rely on simple human wave attacks. Iranian offensives became more complex and involved extensive maneuver warfare using primarily light infantry. Iran launched frequent, and sometimes smaller offensives to slowly gain ground and deplete the Iraqis through attrition. They wanted to drive Iraq into economic failure by wasting money on weapons and war mobilization, and to deplete their smaller population by bleeding them dry, in addition to creating an anti-government insurgency (they were successful in Kurdistan, but not southern Iraq). Iran also supported their attacks with heavy weaponry when possible and with better planning (although the brunt of the battles still fell to the infantry). The Army and Revolutionary Guards worked together better as their tactics improved. Human wave attacks became less frequent (although still used). To negate the Iraqi advantage of defense in depth, static positions, and heavy firepower, Iran began to focus on fighting in areas where the Iraqis could not use their heavy weaponry, such as marshes, valleys, and mountains, and frequently using infiltration tactics.

Iran began training troops in infiltration, patrolling, night-fighting, marsh warfare, and mountain warfare. They also began training thousands of Revolutionary Guard commandos in amphibious warfare, as southern Iraq is marshy and filled with wetlands. Iran used speedboats to cross the marshes and rivers in southern Iraq and landed troops on the opposing banks, where they would dig and set up pontoon bridges across the rivers and wetlands to allow heavy troops and supplies to cross. Iran also learned to integrate foreign guerrilla units as part of their military operations. On the northern front, Iran began working heavily with the Peshmerga, Kurdish guerrillas. Iranian military advisors organised the Kurds into raiding parties of 12 guerrillas, which would attack Iraqi command posts, troop formations, infrastructure (including roads and supply lines), and government buildings. The oil refineries of Kirkuk became a favourite target, and were often hit by homemade Peshmerga rockets.

Battle of the Marshes

By 1984, the Iranian ground forces were reorganised well enough for the Revolutionary Guard to start Operation Kheibar, which lasted from 24 February to 19 March. On 15 February 1984, the Iranians began launching attacks against the central section of the front, where the Second Iraqi Army Corps was deployed: 250,000 Iraqis faced 250,000 Iranians. The goal of this new major offensive was the capture of Basra-Baghdad Highway, cutting off Basra from Baghdad and setting the stage for an eventual attack upon the city. The Iraqi high command had assumed that the marshlands above Basra were natural barriers to attack, and had not reinforced them. The marshes negated Iraqi advantage in armor, and absorbed artillery rounds and bombs.
Prior to the attack, Iranian commandos on helicopters had landed behind Iraqi lines and destroyed Iraqi artillery. Iran launched two preliminary attacks prior to the main offensive, Operation Dawn 5 and Dawn 6. They saw the Iranians attempting to capture Kut al-Imara, Iraq and sever the highway connecting Baghdad to Basra, which would impede Iraqi coordination of supplies and defences. Iranian troops crossed the river on motorboats in a surprise attack, though only came within  of the highway.

Operation Kheibar began on 24 February with Iranian infantrymen crossing the Hawizeh Marshes using motorboats and transport helicopters in an amphibious assault. The Iranians attacked the vital oil-producing Majnoon Island by landing troops via helicopters onto the islands and severing the communication lines between Amareh and Basra. They then continued the attack towards Qurna. By 27 February, they had captured the island, but suffered catastrophic helicopter losses to the IrAF. On that day, a massive array of Iranian helicopters transporting Pasdaran troops were intercepted by Iraqi combat aircraft (MiGs, Mirages and Sukhois). In what was essentially an aerial slaughter, Iraqi jets shot down 49 of the 50 Iranian helicopters. Iraq ran live electrical cables through the water, electrocuting numerous Iranian troops and then displaying their corpses on state television.

By 29 February, the Iranians had reached the outskirts of Qurna and were closing in on the Baghdad–Basra highway. They had broken out of the marshes and returned to open terrain, where they were confronted by conventional Iraqi weapons, including artillery, tanks, air power, and mustard gas. 1,200 Iranian soldiers were killed in the counter-attack. The Iranians retreated back to the marshes, though they still held onto them along with Majnoon Island.

The Battle of the Marshes saw an Iraqi defence that had been under continuous strain since 15 February; they were relieved by their use of chemical weapons and defence-in-depth, where they layered defensive lines: even if the Iranians broke through the first line, they were usually unable to break through the second due to exhaustion and heavy losses. They also largely relied on Mi-24 Hind to "hunt" the Iranian troops in the marshes, and at least 20,000 Iranians were killed in the marsh battles. Iran used the marshes as a springboard for future attacks/infiltrations.

Four years into the war, the human cost to Iran had been 170,000 combat fatalities and 340,000 wounded. Iraqi combat fatalities were estimated at 80,000 with 150,000 wounded.

"Tanker War" and the "War of the Cities"

Unable to launch successful ground attacks against Iran, Iraq used their now expanded air force to carry out strategic bombing against Iranian shipping, economic targets, and cities in order to damage Iran's economy and morale. Iraq also wanted to provoke Iran into doing something that would cause the superpowers to be directly involved in the conflict on the Iraqi side.

Attacks on shipping

The so-called "Tanker War" started when Iraq attacked the oil terminal and oil tankers at Kharg Island in early 1984. Iraq's aim in attacking Iranian shipping was to provoke the Iranians to retaliate with extreme measures, such as closing the Strait of Hormuz to all maritime traffic, thereby bringing American intervention; the United States had threatened several times to intervene if the Strait of Hormuz were closed. As a result, the Iranians limited their retaliatory attacks to Iraqi shipping, leaving the strait open to general passage.

Iraq declared that all ships going to or from Iranian ports in the northern zone of the Persian Gulf were subject to attack. They used F-1 Mirage, Super Etendard, Mig-23, Su-20/22, and Super Frelon helicopters armed with Exocet anti-ship missiles as well as Soviet-made air-to-surface missiles to enforce their threats. Iraq repeatedly bombed Iran's main oil export facility on Kharg Island, causing increasingly heavy damage. As a first response to these attacks, Iran attacked a Kuwaiti tanker carrying Iraqi oil near Bahrain on 13 May 1984, as well as a Saudi tanker in Saudi waters on 16 May. Because Iraq had become landlocked during the course of the war, they had to rely on their Arab allies, primarily Kuwait, to transport their oil. Iran attacked tankers carrying Iraqi oil from Kuwait, later attacking tankers from any Persian Gulf state supporting Iraq. Attacks on ships of noncombatant nations in the Persian Gulf sharply increased thereafter, with both nations attacking oil tankers and merchant ships of neutral nations in an effort to deprive their opponent of trade. The Iranian attacks against Saudi shipping led to Saudi F-15s shooting down a pair of F-4 Phantom II fighters on 5 June 1984.

The air and small-boat attacks, however, did little damage to Persian Gulf state economies, and Iran moved its shipping port to Larak Island in the Strait of Hormuz.

The Iranian Navy imposed a naval blockade of Iraq, using its British-built frigates to stop and inspect any ships thought to be trading with Iraq. They operated with virtual impunity, as Iraqi pilots had little training in hitting naval targets. Some Iranian warships attacked tankers with ship-to-ship missiles, while others used their radars to guide land-based anti-ship missiles to their targets. Iran began to rely on its new Revolutionary Guard's navy, which used Boghammar speedboats fitted with rocket launchers and heavy machine guns. These speedboats would launch surprise attacks against tankers and cause substantial damage. Iran also used F-4 Phantom II fighters and helicopters to launch Maverick missiles and unguided rockets at tankers.

A U.S. Navy ship, was struck on 17 May 1987 by two Exocet anti-ship missiles fired from an Iraqi F-1 Mirage plane. The missiles had been fired at about the time the plane was given a routine radio warning by Stark. The frigate did not detect the missiles with radar, and warning was given by the lookout only moments before they struck. Both missiles hit the ship, and one exploded in crew quarters, killing 37 sailors and wounding 21.

Lloyd's of London, a British insurance market, estimated that the Tanker War damaged 546 commercial vessels and killed about 430 civilian sailors. The largest portion of the attacks was directed by Iraq against vessels in Iranian waters, with the Iraqis launching three times as many attacks as the Iranians. But Iranian speedboat attacks on Kuwaiti shipping led Kuwait to formally petition foreign powers on 1 November 1986 to protect its shipping. The Soviet Union agreed to charter tankers starting in 1987, and the United States Navy offered to provide protection for foreign tankers reflagged and flying the U.S. flag starting 7 March 1987 in Operation Earnest Will. Neutral tankers shipping to Iran were unsurprisingly not protected by Earnest Will, resulting in reduced foreign tanker traffic to Iran, since they risked Iraqi air attack. Iran accused the United States of helping Iraq.

During the course of the war, Iran attacked two Soviet merchant ships.

Seawise Giant, the largest ship ever built, was struck by Iraqi Exocet missiles as it was carrying Iranian crude oil out of the Persian Gulf.

Attacks on cities

Meanwhile, Iraq's air force also began carrying out strategic bombing raids against Iranian cities. While Iraq had launched numerous attacks with aircraft and missiles against border cities from the beginning of the war and sporadic raids on Iran's main cities, this was the first systematic strategic bombing that Iraq carried out during the war. This would become known as the "War of the Cities". With the help of the USSR and the west, Iraq's air force had been rebuilt and expanded. Meanwhile, Iran, due to sanctions and lack of spare parts, had heavily curtailed its air force operations. Iraq used Tu-22 Blinder and Tu-16 Badger strategic bombers to carry out long-range high-speed raids on Iranian cities, including Tehran. Fighter-bombers such as the MiG-25 Foxbat and Su-22 Fitter were used against smaller or shorter range targets, as well as escorting the strategic bombers. Civilian and industrial targets were hit by the raids, and each successful raid inflicted economic damage from regular strategic bombing.

In response, the Iranians deployed their F-4 Phantoms to combat the Iraqis, and eventually they deployed F-14s as well. By 1986, Iran also expanded their air defense network heavily to relieve the pressure on the air force. By later in the war, Iraqi raids primarily consisted of indiscriminate missile attacks  while air attacks were used only on fewer, more important targets. Starting in 1987, Saddam also ordered several chemical attacks on civilian targets in Iran, such as the town of Sardasht.

Iran also launched several retaliatory air raids on Iraq, while primarily shelling border cities such as Basra. Iran also bought some Scud missiles from Libya, and launched them against Baghdad. These too inflicted damage upon Iraq.

On 7 February 1984, during the first war of the cities, Saddam ordered his air force to attack eleven Iranian cities; bombardments ceased on 22 February 1984. Though Saddam intended the attacks to demoralise Iran and force them to negotiate, they had little effect, and Iran quickly repaired the damage. Moreover, Iraq's air force took heavy losses and Iran struck back, hitting Baghdad and other Iraqi cities. The attacks resulted in tens of thousands of civilian casualties on both sides, and became known as the first "war of the cities". It was estimated that 1,200 Iranian civilians were killed during the raids in February alone. There would be five such major exchanges throughout the course of the war, and multiple minor ones. While interior cities such as Tehran, Tabriz, Qom, Isfahan and Shiraz received numerous raids, the cities of western Iran suffered the most.

Strategic situation in 1984
By 1984, Iran's losses were estimated to be 300,000 soldiers, while Iraq's losses were estimated to be 150,000. Foreign analysts agreed that both Iran and Iraq failed to use their modern equipment properly, and both sides failed to carry out modern military assaults that could win the war. Both sides also abandoned equipment in the battlefield because their technicians were unable to carry out repairs. Iran and Iraq showed little internal coordination on the battlefield, and in many cases units were left to fight on their own. As a result, by the end of 1984, the war was a stalemate. One limited offensive Iran launched (Dawn 7) took place from 18 to 25 October 1984, when they recaptured the Iranian city of Mehran, which had been occupied by the Iraqis from the beginning of the war.

1985–86: Offensives and retreats
By 1985, Iraqi armed forces were receiving financial support from Saudi Arabia, Kuwait, and other Persian Gulf states, and were making substantial arms purchases from the Soviet Union, China, and France. For the first time since early 1980, Saddam launched new offensives.

On 6 January 1986, the Iraqis launched an offensive attempting to retake Majnoon Island. However, they were quickly bogged down into a stalemate against 200,000 Iranian infantrymen, reinforced by amphibious divisions. However, they managed to gain a foothold in the southern part of the island.

Iraq also carried out another "war of the cities" between 12 and 14 March, hitting up to 158 targets in over 30 towns and cities, including Tehran. Iran responded by launching 14 Scud missiles for the first time, purchased from Libya. More Iraqi air attacks were carried out in August, resulting in hundreds of additional civilian casualties. Iraqi attacks against both Iranian and neutral oil tankers in Iranian waters continued, with Iraq carrying out 150 airstrikes using French bought Super Etendard and Mirage F-1 jets as well as Super Frelon helicopters, armed with Exocet missiles.

Operation Badr

The Iraqis attacked again on 28 January 1985; they were defeated, and the Iranians retaliated on 11 March 1985 with a major offensive directed against the Baghdad-Basra highway (one of the few major offensives conducted in 1985), codenamed Operation Badr (after the Battle of Badr, Muhammad's first military victory in Mecca). Ayatollah Khomeini urged Iranians on, declaring:

It is our belief that Saddam wishes to return Islam to blasphemy and polytheism...if America becomes victorious...and grants victory to Saddam, Islam will receive such a blow that it will not be able to raise its head for a long time...The issue is one of Islam versus blasphemy, and not of Iran versus Iraq.

This operation was similar to Operation Kheibar, though it invoked more planning. Iran used 100,000 troops, with 60,000 more in reserve. They assessed the marshy terrain, plotted points where they could land tanks, and constructed pontoon bridges across the marshes. The Basij forces were also equipped with anti-tank weapons.

The ferocity of the Iranian offensive broke through the Iraqi lines. The Revolutionary Guard, with the support of tanks and artillery, broke through north of Qurna on 14 March. That same night 3,000 Iranian troops reached and crossed the Tigris River using pontoon bridges and captured part of the Baghdad–Basra Highway 6, which they had failed to achieve in Operations Dawn 5 and 6.

Saddam responded by launching chemical attacks against the Iranian positions along the highway and by initiating the aforementioned second "war of the cities", with an air and missile campaign against twenty to thirty Iranian population centres, including Tehran. Under General Sultan Hashim Ahmad al-Tai and General Jamal Zanoun (both considered to be among Iraq's most skilled commanders), the Iraqis launched air attacks against the Iranian positions and pinned them down. They then launched a pincer attack using mechanized infantry and heavy artillery. Chemical weapons were used, and the Iraqis also flooded Iranian trenches with specially constructed pipes delivering water from the Tigris River.

The Iranians retreated back to the Hoveyzeh marshes while being attacked by helicopters, and the highway was recaptured by the Iraqis. Operation Badr resulted in 10,000–12,000 Iraqi casualties and 15,000 Iranian ones.

Strategic situation at the beginning of 1986

The failure of the human wave attacks in earlier years had prompted Iran to develop a better working relationship between the Army and the Revolutionary Guard and to mould the Revolutionary Guard units into a more conventional fighting force. To combat Iraq's use of chemical weapons, Iran began producing an antidote. They also created and fielded their own homemade drones, the Mohajer 1's, fitted with six RPG-7's to launch attacks. They were primarily used in observation, being used for up to 700 sorties.

For the rest of 1986, and until the spring of 1988, the Iranian Air Force's efficiency in air defence increased, with weapons being repaired or replaced and new tactical methods being used. For example, the Iranians would loosely integrate their SAM Sites and interceptors to create "killing fields" in which dozens of Iraqi planes were lost (which was reported in the West as the Iranian Air Force using F-14s as "mini-AWACs"). The Iraqi Air Force reacted by increasing the sophistication of its equipment, incorporating modern electronic countermeasure pods, decoys such as chaff and flare, and anti-radiation missiles. Due to the heavy losses in the last war of the cities, Iraq reduced their use of aerial attacks on Iranian cities. Instead, they would launch Scud missiles, which the Iranians could not stop. Since the range of the Scud missile was too short to reach Tehran, they converted them to al-Hussein missiles with the help of East German engineers, cutting up their Scuds into three chunks and attaching them together. Iran responded to these attacks by using their own Scud missiles.

Compounding the extensive foreign help to Iraq, Iranian attacks were severely hampered by their shortages of weaponry, particularly heavy weapons as large amounts had been lost during the war. Iran still managed to maintain 1,000 tanks (often by capturing Iraqi ones) and additional artillery, but many needed repairs to be operational. However, by this time Iran managed to procure spare parts from various sources, helping them to restore some weapons. They secretly imported some weapons, such as RBS-70 anti-aircraft MANPADS. In an exception to the United States' support for Iraq, in exchange for Iran using its influence to help free western hostages in Lebanon, the United States secretly sold Iran some limited supplies (in Ayatollah Rafsanjani's postwar interview, he stated that during the period when Iran was succeeding, for a short time the United States supported Iran, then shortly after began helping Iraq again). Iran managed to get some advanced weapons, such as anti-tank TOW missiles, which worked better than rocket-propelled grenades. Iran later reverse-engineered and produced those weapons themselves. All of these almost certainly helped increase the effectiveness of Iran, although it did not reduce the human cost of their attacks.

First Battle of al-Faw

On the night of 10–11 February 1986, the Iranians launched Operation Dawn 8, in which 30,000 troops in five Army divisions and men from the Revolutionary Guard and Basij advanced in a two-pronged offensive to capture the al-Faw peninsula in southern Iraq, the only area touching the Persian Gulf. The capture of Al Faw and Umm Qasr was a major goal for Iran. Iran began with a feint attack against Basra, which was stopped by the Iraqis; Meanwhile, an amphibious strike force landed at the foot of the peninsula. The resistance, consisting of several thousand poorly trained soldiers of the Iraqi Popular Army, fled or were defeated, and the Iranian forces set up pontoon bridges crossing the Shatt al-Arab, allowing 30,000 soldiers to cross in a short period of time. They drove north along the peninsula almost unopposed, capturing it after only 24 hours of fighting. Afterwards they dug in and set up defenses.

The sudden capture of al-Faw shocked the Iraqis, since they had thought it impossible for the Iranians to cross the Shatt al-Arab. On 12 February 1986, the Iraqis began a counter-offensive to retake al-Faw, which failed after a week of heavy fighting. On 24 February 1986, Saddam sent one of his best commanders, General Maher Abd al-Rashid, and the Republican Guard to begin a new offensive to recapture al-Faw. A new round of heavy fighting took place. However, their attempts again ended in failure, costing them many tanks and aircraft: their 15th mechanised division was almost completely wiped out. The capture of al-Faw and the failure of the Iraqi counter-offensives were blows to the Ba'ath regime's prestige, and led the Gulf countries to fear that Iran might win the war.

In March 1986, the Iranians tried to follow up their success by attempting to take Umm Qasr, which would have completely severed Iraq from the Gulf and placed Iranian troops on the border with Kuwait. However, the offensive failed due to Iranian shortages of armor. By this time, 17,000 Iraqis and 30,000 Iranians were made casualties. The First Battle of al-Faw ended in March, but heavy combat operations lasted on the peninsula into 1988, with neither side being able to displace the other. The battle bogged down into a World War I-style stalemate in the marshes of the peninsula.

Battle of Mehran

Immediately after the Iranian capture of al-Faw, Saddam declared a new offensive against Iran, designed to drive deep into the state. The Iranian border city of Mehran, on the foot of the Zagros Mountains, was selected as the first target. On 15–19 May, Iraqi Army's Second Corps, supported by helicopter gunships, attacked and captured the city. Saddam then offered the Iranians to exchange Mehran for al-Faw. The Iranians rejected the offer. Iraq then continued the attack, attempting to push deeper into Iran. However, Iraq's attack was quickly warded off by Iranian AH-1 Cobra helicopters with TOW missiles, which destroyed numerous Iraqi tanks and vehicles.

The Iranians built up their forces on the heights surrounding Mehran. On 30 June, using mountain warfare tactics they launched their attack, recapturing the city by 3 July. Saddam ordered the Republican Guard to retake the city on 4 July, but their attack was ineffective. Iraqi losses were heavy enough to allow the Iranians to also capture territory inside Iraq, and depleted the Iraqi military enough to prevent them from launching a major offensive for the next two years. Iraq's defeats at al-Faw and at Mehran were severe blows to the prestige of the Iraqi regime, and western powers, including the US, became more determined to prevent an Iraqi loss.

Situation at the end of 1986

Through the eyes of international observers, Iran was prevailing in the war by the end of 1986. In the northern front, the Iranians began launching attacks toward the city of Suleimaniya with the help of Kurdish fighters, taking the Iraqis by surprise. They came within  of the city before being stopped by chemical and army attacks. Iran's army had also reached the Meimak Hills, only  from Baghdad. Iraq managed to contain Iran's offensives in the south, but was under serious pressure, as the Iranians were slowly overwhelming them.

Iraq responded by launching another "war of the cities". In one attack, Tehran's main oil refinery was hit, and in another instance, Iraq damaged Iran's Assadabad satellite dish, disrupting Iranian overseas telephone and telex service for almost two weeks. Civilian areas were also hit, resulting in many casualties. Iraq continued to attack oil tankers via air. Iran responded by launching Scud missiles and air attacks at Iraqi targets.

Iraq continued to attack Kharg Island and the oil tankers and facilities as well. Iran created a tanker shuttle service of 20 tankers to move oil from Kharg to Larak Island, escorted by Iranian fighter jets. Once moved to Larak, the oil would be moved to oceangoing tankers (usually neutral). They also rebuilt the oil terminals damaged by Iraqi air raids and moved shipping to Larak Island, while attacking foreign tankers that carried Iraqi oil (as Iran had blocked Iraq's access to the open sea with the capture of al-Faw). By now they almost always used the armed speedboats of the IRGC navy, and attacked many tankers. The tanker war escalated drastically, with attacks nearly doubling in 1986 (the majority carried out by Iraq). Iraq got permission from the Saudi government to use its airspace to attack Larak Island, although due to the distance attacks were less frequent there. The escalating tanker war in the Gulf became an ever-increasing concern to foreign powers, especially the United States.

In April 1986, Ayatollah Khomeini issued a fatwa declaring that the war must be won by March 1987. The Iranians increased recruitment efforts, obtaining 650,000 volunteers. The animosity between the Army and the Revolutionary Guard arose again, with the Army wanting to use more refined, limited military attacks while the Revolutionary Guard wanted to carry out major offensives. Iran, confident in its successes, began planning their largest offensives of the war, which they called their "final offensives".

Iraq's dynamic defense strategy

Faced with their recent defeats in al-Faw and Mehran, Iraq appeared to be losing the war. Iraq's generals, angered by Saddam's interference, threatened a full-scale mutiny against the Ba'ath Party unless they were allowed to conduct operations freely. In one of the few times during his career, Saddam gave in to the demands of his generals. Up to this point, Iraqi strategy was to ride out Iranian attacks. However, the defeat at al-Faw led Saddam to declare the war to be Al-Defa al-Mutaharakha (The Dynamic Defense), and announcing that all civilians had to take part in the war effort. The universities were closed and all of the male students were drafted into the military. Civilians were instructed to clear marshlands to prevent Iranian amphibious infiltrations and to help build fixed defenses.

The government tried to integrate the Shias into the war effort by recruiting many as part of the Ba'ath Party. In an attempt to counterbalance the religious fervor of the Iranians and gain support from the devout masses, the regime also began to promote religion and, on the surface, Islamization, despite the fact that Iraq was run by a secular regime. Scenes of Saddam praying and making pilgrimages to shrines became common on state-run television. While Iraqi morale had been low throughout the war, the attack on al-Faw raised patriotic fervor, as the Iraqis feared invasion. Saddam also recruited volunteers from other Arab countries into the Republican Guard, and received much technical support from foreign nations as well. While Iraqi military power had been depleted in recent battles, through heavy foreign purchases and support, they were able to expand their military even to much larger proportions by 1988.

At the same time, Saddam ordered the genocidal al-Anfal Campaign in an attempt to crush the Kurdish resistance, who were now allied with Iran. The result was the deaths of several hundred thousand Iraqi Kurds, and the destruction of villages, towns, and cities.

Iraq began to try to perfect its maneuver tactics. The Iraqis began to prioritize the professionalization of their military. Prior to 1986, the conscription-based Iraqi regular army and the volunteer-based Iraqi Popular Army conducted the bulk of the operations in the war, to little effect. The Republican Guard, formerly an elite praetorian guard, was expanded as a volunteer army and filled with Iraq's best generals. Loyalty to the state was no longer a primary requisite for joining. After the war, due to Saddam's paranoia, the former duties of the Republican Guard were transferred to a new unit, the Special Republican Guard. Full-scale war games against hypothetical Iranian positions were carried out in the western Iraqi desert against mock targets, and they were repeated over the course of a full year until the forces involved fully memorized their attacks. Iraq built its military massively, eventually possessing the 4th largest in the world, in order to overwhelm the Iranians through sheer size.

1987–88: Renewed Iranian Offensives

Meanwhile, Iran continued to attack as the Iraqis were planning their strike. In 1987 the Iranians renewed a series of major human wave offensives in both northern and southern Iraq. The Iraqis had elaborately fortified Basra with 5 defensive rings, exploiting natural waterways such as the Shatt-al-Arab and artificial ones, such as Fish Lake and the Jasim River, along with earth barriers. Fish Lake was a massive lake filled with mines, underwater barbed wire, electrodes and sensors. Behind each waterway and defensive line was radar-guided artillery, ground attack aircraft and helicopters, all capable of firing poison gas or conventional munitions.

The Iranian strategy was to penetrate the Iraqi defences and encircle Basra, cutting off the city as well as the Al-Faw peninsula from the rest of Iraq. Iran's plan was for three assaults: a diversionary attack near Basra, the main offensive and another diversionary attack using Iranian tanks in the north to divert Iraqi heavy armor from Basra. For these battles, Iran had re-expanded their military by recruiting many new Basij and Pasdaran volunteers. Iran brought 150,000–200,000 total troops into the battles.

Operation Karbala-4 
On 25 December 1986, Iran launched Operation Karbala-4 (Karbala referring to Hussein ibn Ali's Battle of Karbala). According to Iraqi General Ra'ad al-Hamdani, this was a diversionary attack. The Iranians launched an amphibious assault against the Iraqi island of Umm al-Rassas in the Shatt-Al-Arab river, parallel to Khoramshahr. They then set up a pontoon bridge and continued the attack, eventually capturing the island in a costly success but failing to advance further; the Iranians had 60,000 casualties, while the Iraqis 9,500. The Iraqi commanders exaggerated Iranian losses to Saddam, and it was assumed that the main Iranian attack on Basra had been fully defeated and that it would take the Iranians six months to recover. When the main Iranian attack, Operation Karbala 5, began, many Iraqi troops were on leave.

Karbala-5 (Sixth Battle of Basra)
The Siege of Basra, code-named Operation Karbala-5, was an offensive operation carried out by Iran in an effort to capture the Iraqi port city of Basra in early 1987. This battle, known for its extensive casualties and ferocious conditions, was the biggest battle of the war and proved to be the beginning of the end of the Iran–Iraq War. While Iranian forces crossed the border and captured the eastern section of Basra Governorate, the operation ended in a stalemate.

Karbala-6
At the same time as Operation Karbala 5, Iran also launched Operation Karbala-6 against the Iraqis in Qasr-e Shirin in central Iran to prevent the Iraqis from rapidly transferring units down to defend against the Karbala-5 attack. The attack was carried out by Basij infantry and the Revolutionary Guard's 31st Ashura and the Army's 77th Khorasan armored divisions. The Basij attacked the Iraqi lines, forcing the Iraqi infantry to retreat. An Iraqi armored counter-attack surrounded the Basij in a pincer movement, but the Iranian tank divisions attacked, breaking the encirclement. The Iranian attack was finally stopped by mass Iraqi chemical weapons attacks.

Iranian war-weariness

Operation Karbala-5 was a severe blow to Iran's military and morale. To foreign observers, it appeared that Iran was continuing to strengthen. By 1988, Iran had become self-sufficient in many areas, such as anti-tank TOW missiles, Scud ballistic missiles (Shahab-1), Silkworm anti-ship missiles, Oghab tactical rockets, and producing spare parts for their weaponry. Iran had also improved its air defenses with smuggled surface to air missiles. Iran was even producing UAV's and the Pilatus PC-7 propeller aircraft for observation. Iran also doubled their stocks of artillery, and was self-sufficient in the manufacture of ammunition and small arms.

While it was not obvious to foreign observers, the Iranian public had become increasingly war-weary and disillusioned with the fighting, and relatively few volunteers joined the fight in 1987–88. Because the Iranian war effort relied on popular mobilization, their military strength actually declined, and Iran was unable to launch any major offensives after Karbala-5. As a result, for the first time since 1982, the momentum of the fighting shifted towards the regular army. Since the regular army was conscription based, it made the war even less popular. Many Iranians began to try to escape the conflict. As early as May 1985, anti-war demonstrations took place in 74 cities throughout Iran, which were crushed by the regime, resulting in some protesters being shot and killed. By 1987, draft-dodging had become a serious problem, and the Revolutionary Guards and police set up roadblocks throughout cities to capture those who tried to evade conscription. Others, particularly the more nationalistic and religious, the clergy, and the Revolutionary Guards, wished to continue the war.

The leadership acknowledged that the war was a stalemate, and began to plan accordingly. No more "final offensives" were planned. The head of the Supreme Defense Council Hashemi Rafsanjani announced during a news conference the end of human wave attacks. Mohsen Rezaee, head of the IRGC, announced that Iran would focus exclusively on limited attacks and infiltrations, while arming and supporting opposition groups inside of Iraq.

On the Iranian home front, sanctions, declining oil prices, and Iraqi attacks on Iranian oil facilities and shipping took a heavy toll on the economy. While the attacks themselves were not as destructive as some analysts believed, the U.S.-led Operation Earnest Will (which protected Iraqi and allied oil tankers, but not Iranian ones) led many neutral countries to stop trading with Iran because of rising insurance and fear of air attack. Iranian oil and non-oil exports fell by 55%, inflation reached 50% by 1987, and unemployment skyrocketed. At the same time, Iraq was experiencing crushing debt and shortages of workers, encouraging its leadership to try to end the war quickly.

Strategic situation in late 1987

By the end of 1987, Iraq possessed 5,550 tanks (outnumbering the Iranians six to one) and 900 fighter aircraft (outnumbering the Iranians ten to one). After Operation Karbala-5, Iraq only had 100 qualified fighter pilots remaining; therefore, Iraq began to invest in recruiting foreign pilots from countries such as Belgium, South Africa, Pakistan, East Germany and the Soviet Union. They replenished their manpower by integrating volunteers from other Arab countries into their army. Iraq also became self-sufficient in chemical weapons and some conventional ones and received much equipment from abroad. Foreign support helped Iraq bypass its economic troubles and massive debt to continue the war and increase the size of its military.

While the southern and central fronts were at a stalemate, Iran began to focus on carrying out offensives in northern Iraq with the help of the Peshmerga (Kurdish insurgents). The Iranians used a combination of semi-guerrilla and infiltration tactics in the Kurdish mountains with the Peshmerga. During Operation Karbala-9 in early April, Iran captured territory near Suleimaniya, provoking a severe poison gas counter-attack. During Operation Karbala-10, Iran attacked near the same area, capturing more territory. During Operation Nasr-4, the Iranians surrounded the city of Suleimaniya and, with the help of the Peshmerga, infiltrated over 140 km into Iraq and raided and threatened to capture the oil-rich city of Kirkuk and other northern oilfields. Nasr-4 was considered to be Iran's most successful individual operation of the war but Iranian forces were unable to consolidate their gains and continue their advance; while these offensives coupled with the Kurdish uprising sapped Iraqi strength, losses in the north would not mean a catastrophic failure for Iraq.

On 20 July, the UN Security Council passed the U.S.-sponsored Resolution 598, which called for an end to the fighting and a return to pre-war boundaries. This resolution was noted by Iran for being the first resolution to call for a return to the pre-war borders, and setting up a commission to determine the aggressor and compensation.

Air and tanker war in 1987 

With the stalemate on land, the air/tanker war began to play an increasingly major role in the conflict. The Iranian air force had become very small, with only 20 F-4 Phantoms, 20 F-5 Tigers, and 15 F-14 Tomcats in operation, although Iran managed to restore some damaged planes to service. The Iranian Air Force, despite its once sophisticated equipment, lacked enough equipment and personnel to sustain the war of attrition that had developed, and was unable to lead an outright onslaught against Iraq. The Iraqi Air Force, however, had originally lacked modern equipment and experienced pilots, but after pleas from Iraqi military leaders, Saddam decreased political influence on everyday operations and left the fighting to his combatants. The Soviets began delivering more advanced aircraft and weapons to Iraq, while the French improved training for flight crews and technical personnel and continually introduced new methods for countering Iranian weapons and tactics. Iranian ground air defense still shot down many Iraqi aircraft.

The main Iraqi air effort had shifted to the destruction of Iranian war-fighting capability (primarily Persian Gulf oil fields, tankers, and Kharg Island), and starting in late 1986, the Iraqi Air Force began a comprehensive campaign against the Iranian economic infrastructure. By late 1987, the Iraqi Air Force could count on direct American support for conducting long-range operations against Iranian infrastructural targets and oil installations deep in the Persian Gulf. U.S. Navy ships tracked and reported movements of Iranian shipping and defences. In the massive Iraqi air strike against Kharg Island, flown on 18 March 1988, the Iraqis destroyed two supertankers but lost five aircraft to Iranian F-14 Tomcats, including two Tupolev Tu-22Bs and one Mikoyan MiG-25RB. The U.S. Navy was now becoming more involved in the fight in the Persian Gulf, launching Operations Earnest Will and Prime Chance against the Iranians.

The attacks on oil tankers continued. Both Iran and Iraq carried out frequent attacks during the first four months of the year. Iran was effectively waging a naval guerilla war with its IRGC navy speedboats, while Iraq attacked with its aircraft. In 1987, Kuwait asked to reflag its tankers to the U.S. flag. They did so in March, and the U.S. Navy began Operation Earnest Will to escort the tankers. The result of Earnest Will would be that, while oil tankers shipping Iraqi/Kuwaiti oil were protected, Iranian tankers and neutral tankers shipping to Iran would be unprotected, resulting in both losses for Iran and the undermining of its trade with foreign countries, damaging Iran's economy further. Iran deployed Silkworm missiles to attack ships, but only a few were actually fired. Both the United States and Iran jockeyed for influence in the Gulf. To discourage the United States from escorting tankers, Iran secretly mined some areas. The United States began to escort the reflagged tankers, but one was damaged by a mine while under escort. While being a public-relations victory for Iran, the United States increased its reflagging efforts. While Iran mined the Persian Gulf, their speedboat attacks were reduced, primarily attacking unflagged tankers shipping in the area.

On 24 September, US Navy SEALS captured the Iranian mine-laying ship Iran Ajr, a diplomatic disaster for the already isolated Iranians. Iran had previously sought to maintain at least a pretense of plausible deniability regarding its use of mines, but the Navy SEALS captured and photographed extensive evidence of Iran Ajrs mine-laying activities. On 8 October, the U.S. Navy destroyed four Iranian speedboats, and in response to Iranian Silkworm missile attacks on Kuwaiti oil tankers, launched Operation Nimble Archer, destroying two Iranian oil rigs in the Persian Gulf. During November and December, the Iraqi air force launched a bid to destroy all Iranian airbases in Khuzestan and the remaining Iranian air force. Iran managed to shoot down 30 Iraqi fighters with fighter jets, anti-aircraft guns, and missiles, allowing the Iranian air force to survive to the end of the war.

On 28 June, Iraqi fighter bombers attacked the Iranian town of Sardasht near the border, using chemical mustard gas bombs. While many towns and cities had been bombed before, and troops attacked with gas, this was the first time that the Iraqis had attacked a civilian area with poison gas. One quarter of the town's then population of 20,000 was burned and stricken, and 113 were killed immediately, with many more dying and suffering health effects over following decades. Saddam ordered the attack in order to test the effects of the newly developed "dusty mustard" gas, which was designed to be even more crippling than traditional mustard gas. While little known outside of Iran (unlike the later Halabja massacre), the Sardasht bombing (and future similar attacks) had a tremendous effect on the Iranian people's psyche.

1988: Final Iraqi offensives

By 1988, with massive equipment imports and reduced Iranian volunteers, Iraq was ready to launch major offensives against Iran. In February 1988, Saddam began the fifth and most deadly "war of the cities". Over the next two months, Iraq launched over 200 al-Hussein missiles at 37 Iranian cities. Saddam also threatened to use chemical weapons in his missiles, which caused 30% of Tehran's population to leave the city. Iran retaliated, launching at least 104 missiles against Iraq in 1988 and shelling Basra. This event was nicknamed the "Scud Duel" in the foreign media. In all, Iraq launched 520 Scuds and al-Husseins against Iran and Iran fired 177 in return. The Iranian attacks were too few in number to deter Iraq from launching their attacks. Iraq also increased their airstrikes against Kharg Island and Iranian oil tankers. With their tankers protected by U.S. warships, they could operate with virtual impunity. In addition, the West supplied Iraq's air force with laser-guided smart bombs, allowing them to attack economic targets while evading anti-aircraft defenses. These attacks began to have a major toll on the Iranian economy and morale and caused many casualties.

Iran's Kurdistan Operations

In March 1988, the Iranians carried out Operation Dawn 10, Operation Beit ol-Moqaddas 2, and Operation Zafar 7 in Iraqi Kurdistan with the aim of capturing the Darbandikhan Dam and the power plant at Lake Dukan, which supplied Iraq with much of its electricity and water, as well as the city of Suleimaniya. Iran hoped that the capture of these areas would bring more favourable terms to the ceasefire agreement. This infiltration offensive was carried out in conjunction with the Peshmerga. Iranian airborne commandos landed behind the Iraqi lines and Iranian helicopters hit Iraqi tanks with TOW missiles. The Iraqis were taken by surprise, and Iranian F-5E Tiger fighter jets even damaged the Kirkuk oil refinery. Iraq carried out executions of multiple officers for these failures in March–April 1988, including Colonel Jafar Sadeq. The Iranians used infiltration tactics in the Kurdish mountains, captured the town of Halabja and began to fan out across the province.

The Iraqis launched the deadliest chemical weapons attacks of the war. The Republican Guard launched 700 chemical shells, while the other artillery divisions launched 200–300 chemical shells each, unleashing a chemical cloud over the Iranians, killing or wounding 60% of them, the blow was felt particularly by the Iranian 84th infantry division and 55th paratrooper division. The Iraqi special forces then stopped the remains of the Iranian force. In retaliation for Kurdish collaboration with the Iranians, Iraq launched a massive poison gas attack against Kurdish civilians in Halabja, recently taken by the Iranians, killing thousands of civilians. Iran airlifted foreign journalists to the ruined city, and the images of the dead were shown throughout the world, but Western mistrust of Iran and collaboration with Iraq led them to also blame Iran for the attack.

Second Battle of al-Faw

On 17 April 1988, Iraq launched Operation Ramadan Mubarak (Blessed Ramadan), a surprise attack against the 15,000 Basij troops on the al-Faw peninsula. The attack was preceded by Iraqi diversionary attacks in northern Iraq, with a massive artillery and air barrage of Iranian front lines. Key areas, such as supply lines, command posts, and ammunition depots, were hit by a storm of mustard gas and nerve gas, as well as by conventional explosives. Helicopters landed Iraqi commandos behind Iranian lines on al-Faw while the main Iraqi force made a frontal assault. Within 48 hours, all of the Iranian forces had been killed or cleared from the al-Faw Peninsula. The day was celebrated in Iraq as Faw Liberation Day throughout Saddam's rule. The Iraqis had planned the offensive well. Prior to the attack, the Iraqi soldiers gave themselves poison gas antidotes to shield themselves from the effect of the saturation of gas. The heavy and well executed use of chemical weapons was the decisive factor in the victory. Iraqi losses were relatively light, especially compared to Iran's casualties. Ra'ad al-Hamdani later recounted that the recapture of al-Faw marked "the highest point of experience and expertise that the Iraqi Army reached." The Iranians eventually managed to halt the Iraqi drive as they pushed towards Khuzestan.

To the shock of the Iranians, rather than breaking off the offensive, the Iraqis kept up their drive, and a new force attacked the Iranian positions around Basra. Following this, the Iraqis launched a sustained drive to clear the Iranians out of all of southern Iraq. One of the most successful Iraqi tactics was the "one-two punch" attack using chemical weapons. Using artillery, they would saturate the Iranian front line with rapidly dispersing cyanide and nerve gas, while longer-lasting mustard gas was launched via fighter-bombers and rockets against the Iranian rear, creating a "chemical wall" that blocked reinforcement.

Operation Praying Mantis

The same day as Iraq's attack on al-Faw peninsula, the United States Navy launched Operation Praying Mantis in retaliation against Iran for damaging a warship with a mine. Iran lost oil platforms, destroyers, and frigates in this battle, which ended only when President Reagan decided that the Iranian navy had been damaged enough. In spite of this, the Revolutionary Guard Navy continued their speedboat attacks against oil tankers. The defeats at al-Faw and in the Persian Gulf nudged Iranian leadership towards quitting the war, especially when facing the prospect of fighting the Americans.

Iranian counteroffensive
Faced with such losses, Khomeini appointed the cleric Hashemi Rafsanjani as the Supreme Commander of the Armed Forces, though he had in actuality occupied that position for months. Rafsanjani ordered a last desperate counter-attack into Iraq, which was launched 13 June 1988. The Iranians infiltrated through the Iraqi trenches and moved  into Iraq and managed to strike Saddam's presidential palace in Baghdad using fighter aircraft. After three days of fighting, the decimated Iranians were driven back to their original positions again as the Iraqis launched 650 helicopter and 300 aircraft sorties.

Operation Forty Stars
On 18 June, Iraq launched Operation Forty Stars ( chehel cheragh) in conjunction with the Mujahideen-e-Khalq (MEK) around Mehran. With 530 aircraft sorties and heavy use of nerve gas, they crushed the Iranian forces in the area, killing 3,500 and nearly destroying a Revolutionary Guard division. Mehran was captured once again and occupied by the MEK. Iraq also launched air raids on Iranian population centres and economic targets, setting 10 oil installations on fire.

Tawakalna ala Allah operations
On 25 May 1988, Iraq launched the first of five Tawakalna ala Allah Operations, consisting of one of the largest artillery barrages in history, coupled with chemical weapons. The marshes had been dried by drought, allowing the Iraqis to use tanks to bypass Iranian field fortifications, expelling the Iranians from the border town of Shalamcheh after less than 10 hours of combat.

On 25 June, Iraq launched the second Tawakal ala Allah operation against the Iranians on Majnoon Island. Iraqi commandos used amphibious craft to block the Iranian rear, then used hundreds of tanks with massed conventional and chemical artillery barrages to recapture the island after 8 hours of combat. Saddam appeared live on Iraqi television to "lead" the charge against the Iranians. The majority of the Iranian defenders were killed during the quick assault. The final two Tawakal ala Allah operations took place near al-Amarah and Khaneqan. By 12 July, the Iraqis had captured the city of Dehloran,  inside Iran, along with 2,500 troops and much armour and material, which took four days to transport to Iraq. These losses included more than 570 of the 1,000 remaining Iranian tanks, over 430 armored vehicles, 45 self-propelled artillery, 300 towed artillery pieces, and 320 antiaircraft guns. These figures only included what Iraq could actually put to use; total amount of captured materiel was higher. Since March, the Iraqis claimed to have captured 1,298 tanks, 155 infantry fighting vehicles, 512 heavy artillery pieces, 6,196 mortars, 5,550 recoilless rifles and light guns, 8,050-man-portable rocket launchers, 60,694 rifles, 322 pistols, 454 trucks, and 1,600 light vehicles. The Iraqis withdrew from Dehloran soon after, claiming that they had "no desire to conquer Iranian territory". History professor Kaveh Farrokh considered this to be Iran's greatest military disaster during the war. Stephen Pelletier, a Journalist, Middle East expert, and author, noted that "Tawakal ala Allah ... resulted in the absolute destruction of Iran's military machine."

During the 1988 battles, the Iranians put up little resistance, having been worn out by nearly eight years of war. They lost large amounts of equipment. On 2 July, Iran belatedly set up a joint central command which unified the Revolutionary Guard, Army, and Kurdish rebels, and dispelled the rivalry between the Army and the Revolutionary Guard. However, this came too late and, following the capture of 570 of their operable tanks and the destruction of hundreds more, Iran was believed to have fewer than 200 remaining operable tanks on the southern front, against thousands of Iraqi ones. The only area where the Iranians were not suffering major defeats was in Kurdistan.

Iran accepts the ceasefire

Saddam sent a warning to Khomeini in mid-1988, threatening to launch a new and powerful full-scale invasion and attack Iranian cities with weapons of mass destruction. Shortly afterwards, Iraqi aircraft bombed the Iranian town of Oshnavieh with poison gas, immediately killing and wounding over 2,000 civilians. The fear of an all out chemical attack against Iran's largely unprotected civilian population weighed heavily on the Iranian leadership, and they realized that the international community had no intention of restraining Iraq. The lives of the civilian population of Iran were becoming very disrupted, with a third of the urban population evacuating major cities in fear of the seemingly imminent chemical war. Meanwhile, Iraqi conventional bombs and missiles continuously hit towns and cities, destroying vital civilian and military infrastructure, and increasing the death toll. Iran replied with missile and air attacks, but not sufficiently to deter the Iraqis.

With the threat of a new and even more powerful invasion, Commander-in-Chief Rafsanjani ordered the Iranians to retreat from Haj Omran, Kurdistan on 14 July. The Iranians did not publicly describe this as a retreat, instead calling it a "temporary withdrawal". By July, Iran's army inside Iraq had largely disintegrated. Iraq put up a massive display of captured Iranian weapons in Baghdad, claiming they captured 1,298 tanks, 5,550 recoil-less rifles, and thousands of other weapons. However, Iraq had taken heavy losses as well, and the battles were very costly.

In July 1988, Iraqi aircraft dropped bombs on the Iranian Kurdish village of Zardan. Dozens of villages, such as Sardasht, and some larger towns, such as Marivan, Baneh and Saqqez, were once again attacked with poison gas, resulting in even heavier civilian casualties. On 3 July 1988, the USS Vincennes shot down Iran Air Flight 655, killing 290 passengers and crew. The lack of international sympathy disturbed the Iranian leadership, and they came to the conclusion that the United States was on the verge of waging a full-scale war against them, and that Iraq was on the verge of unleashing its entire chemical arsenal upon their cities.

At this point, elements of the Iranian leadership, led by Rafsanjani (who had initially pushed for the extension of the war), persuaded Khomeini to accept a ceasefire. They stated that in order to win the war, Iran's military budget would have to be increased eightfold and the war would last until 1993. On 20 July 1988, Iran accepted Resolution 598, showing its willingness to accept a ceasefire. A statement from Khomeini was read out in a radio address, and he expressed deep displeasure and reluctance about accepting the ceasefire,

Happy are those who have departed through martyrdom. Happy are those who have lost their lives in this convoy of light. Unhappy am I that I still survive and have drunk the poisoned chalice...

The news of the end of the war was greeted with celebration in Baghdad, with people dancing in the streets; in Tehran, however, the end of the war was greeted with a somber mood.

Operation Mersad and end of the war
Operation Mersad ( "ambush") was the last big military operation of the war. Both Iran and Iraq had accepted Resolution 598, but despite the ceasefire, after seeing Iraqi victories in the previous months, Mujahadeen-e-Khalq (MEK) decided to launch an attack of its own and wished to advance all the way to Tehran. Saddam and the Iraqi high command decided on a two-pronged offensive across the border into central Iran and Iranian Kurdistan. Shortly after Iran accepted the ceasefire the MEK army began its offensive, attacking into Ilam province under cover of Iraqi air power. In the north, Iraq also launched an attack into Iraqi Kurdistan, which was blunted by the Iranians.

On 26 July 1988, the MEK started their campaign in central Iran, Operation Forough Javidan (Eternal Light), with the support of the Iraqi army. The Iranians had withdrawn their remaining soldiers to Khuzestan in fear of a new Iraqi invasion attempt, allowing the Mujahedeen to advance rapidly towards Kermanshah, seizing Qasr-e Shirin, Sarpol-e Zahab, Kerend-e Gharb, and Islamabad-e-Gharb. In response, the Iranian military launched its counter-attack, Operation Mersad, under Lieutenant General Ali Sayyad Shirazi. Iranian paratroopers landed behind the MEK lines while the Iranian Air Force and helicopters launched an air attack, destroying much of the enemy columns. The Iranians defeated the MEK in the city of Kerend-e Gharb on 29 July 1988. On 31 July, Iran drove the MEK out of Qasr-e-Shirin and Sarpol Zahab, though MEK claimed to have "voluntarily withdrawn" from the towns. Iran estimated that 4,500 MEK were killed, while 400 Iranian soldiers died.

The last notable combat actions of the war took place on 3 August 1988, in the Persian Gulf when the Iranian navy fired on a freighter and Iraq launched chemical attacks on Iranian civilians, killing an unknown number of them and wounding 2,300. Iraq came under international pressure to curtail further offensives. Resolution 598 became effective on 8 August 1988, ending all combat operations between the two countries. By 20 August 1988, peace with Iran was restored. UN peacekeepers belonging to the UNIIMOG mission took the field, remaining on the Iran–Iraq border until 1991. The majority of Western analysts believe that the war had no winners while some believed that Iraq emerged as the victor of the war, based on Iraq's overwhelming successes between April and July 1988. While the war was now over, Iraq spent the rest of August and early September clearing the Kurdish resistance. Using 60,000 troops along with helicopter gunships, chemical weapons (poison gas), and mass executions, Iraq hit 15 villages, killing rebels and civilians, and forced tens of thousands of Kurds to relocate to settlements. Many Kurdish civilians fled to Iran. By 3 September 1988, the anti-Kurd campaign ended, and all resistance had been crushed. 400 Iraqi soldiers and 50,000–100,000 Kurdish civilians and soldiers had been killed.

At the war's conclusion, it took several weeks for the Armed Forces of the Islamic Republic of Iran to evacuate Iraqi territory to honor pre-war international borders set by the 1975 Algiers Agreement. The last prisoners of war were exchanged in 2003.

The Security Council did not identify Iraq as the aggressor of the war until 11 December 1991, some 11 years after Iraq invaded Iran and 16 months following Iraq's invasion of Kuwait.

Aftermath

Casualties

The Iran–Iraq War was the deadliest conventional war ever fought between regular armies of developing countries. Encyclopædia Britannica states: "Estimates of total casualties range from 1,000,000 to twice that number. The number killed on both sides was perhaps 500,000, with Iran suffering the greatest losses." Iraqi casualties are estimated at 105,000–200,000 killed, while about 400,000 had been wounded and some 70,000 taken prisoner. Thousands of civilians on both sides died in air raids and ballistic missile attacks. Prisoners taken by both countries began to be released in 1990, though some were not released until more than 10 years after the end of the conflict. Cities on both sides had also been considerably damaged. While revolutionary Iran had been bloodied, Iraq was left with a large military and was a regional power, albeit with severe debt, financial problems, and labour shortages.

According to Iranian government sources, the war cost Iran an estimated 200,000–220,000 killed, or up to 262,000 according to the conservative Western estimates. This includes 123,220 combatants, 60,711 MIA and 11,000–16,000 civilians. Combatants include 79,664 members of the Revolutionary Guard Corps and additional 35,170 soldiers from regular military. In addition, prisoners of war accounted for 42,875 Iranian casualties, captured and kept in Iraqi detention centres from 2.5 to more than 15 years after the war was over. According to the Janbazan Affairs Organization, 398,587 Iranians sustained injuries that required prolonged medical and health care following primary treatment, including 52,195 (13%) injured due to the exposure to chemical warfare agents. From 1980 to 2012, 218,867 Iranians died due to war injuries and the mean age of combatants was 23 years old. This includes 33,430 civilians, mostly women and children. More than 144,000 Iranian children were orphaned as a consequence of these deaths. Other estimates put Iranian casualties up to 600,000.

Both Iraq and Iran manipulated loss figures to suit their purposes. At the same time, Western analysts accepted improbable estimates. By April 1988, such casualties were estimated at between 150,000 and 340,000 Iraqis dead, and 450,000 to 730,000 Iranians. Shortly after the end of the war, it was thought that Iran suffered even more than a million dead. Considering the style of fighting on the ground and the fact that neither side penetrated deeply into the other's territory, USMC analysts believe events do not substantiate the high casualties claimed. The Iraqi government has claimed 800,000 Iranians were killed in action, four times more than Iranian official figures, whereas Iraqi intelligence privately put the number at 228,000–258,000 as of August 1986. Iraqi losses were also revised downwards over time.

Peace talks and postwar situation

With the ceasefire in place, and UN peacekeepers monitoring the border, Iran and Iraq sent their representatives to Geneva, Switzerland, to negotiate a peace agreement on the terms of the ceasefire. However, peace talks stalled. Foreign powers continued to support Iraq, which wanted to gain at the negotiating table what they failed to achieve on the battlefield, and Iran was portrayed as the one not wanting peace. Iran, in response, refused to release 70,000 Iraqi prisoners of war (compared to 40,000 Iranian prisoners of war held by Iraq). They also continued to carry out a naval blockade of Iraq, although its effects were mitigated by Iraqi use of ports in friendly neighbouring Arab countries. Iran also began to improve relations with many of the states that opposed it during the war. Because of Iranian actions, by 1990, Saddam had become more conciliatory, and in a letter to the future fourth President of Iran Rafsanjani, he became more open to the idea of a peace agreement, although he still insisted on full sovereignty over the Shatt al-Arab.

By 1990, Iran was undergoing military rearmament and reorganization, and purchased $10 billion worth of heavy weaponry from the USSR and China, including aircraft, tanks, and missiles. Rafsanjani reversed Iran's self-imposed ban on chemical weapons, and ordered the manufacture and stockpile of them (Iran destroyed them in 1993 after ratifying the Chemical Weapons Convention). As war with the western powers loomed, Iraq became concerned about the possibility of Iran mending its relations with the west in order to attack Iraq. Iraq had lost its support from the West, and its position in Iran was increasingly untenable. Saddam realized that if Iran attempted to expel the Iraqis from the disputed territories in the border area, it was likely they would succeed. Shortly after his invasion of Kuwait, Saddam wrote a letter to Rafsanjani stating that Iraq recognised Iranian rights over the eastern half of the Shatt al-Arab, a reversion to status quo ante bellum that he had repudiated a decade earlier, and that he would accept Iran's demands and withdraw Iraq's military from the disputed territories. A peace agreement was signed finalizing the terms of the UN resolution, diplomatic relations were restored, and by late 1990-early 1991, the Iraqi military withdrew. The UN peacekeepers withdrew from the border shortly afterward. Most of the prisoners of war were released in 1990, although some remained as late as 2003. Iranian politicians declared it to be the "greatest victory in the history of the Islamic Republic of Iran".

Most historians and analysts consider the war to be a stalemate. Certain analysts believe that Iraq won, on the basis of the successes of their 1988 offensives which thwarted Iran's major territorial ambitions in Iraq and persuaded Iran to accept the ceasefire. Iranian analysts believe that they won the war because although they did not succeed in overthrowing the Iraqi government, they thwarted Iraq's major territorial ambitions in Iran, and that, two years after the war had ended, Iraq permanently gave up its claim of ownership over the entire Shatt al-Arab as well.

On 9 December 1991, Javier Pérez de Cuéllar, UN Secretary General at the time, reported that Iraq's initiation of the war was unjustified, as was its occupation of Iranian territory and use of chemical weapons against civilians:

That [Iraq's] explanations do not appear sufficient or acceptable to the international community is a fact...[the attack] cannot be justified under the charter of the United Nations, any recognized rules and principles of international law, or any principles of international morality, and entails the responsibility for conflict. Even if before the outbreak of the conflict there had been some encroachment by Iran on Iraqi territory, such encroachment did not justify Iraq's aggression against Iran—which was followed by Iraq's continuous occupation of Iranian territory during the conflict—in violation of the prohibition of the use of force, which is regarded as one of the rules of jus cogens...On one occasion I had to note with deep regret the experts' conclusion that "chemical weapons ha[d] been used against Iranian civilians in an area adjacent to an urban center lacking any protection against that kind of attack."

He also stated that had the UN accepted this fact earlier, the war would have almost certainly not lasted as long as it did. Iran, encouraged by the announcement, sought reparations from Iraq, but never received any.

Throughout the 1990s and early 2000s, Iran and Iraq relations remained balanced between a cold war and a cold peace. Despite renewed and somewhat thawed relations, both sides continued to have low level conflicts. Iraq continued to host and support the Mujahedeen-e-Khalq, which carried out multiple attacks throughout Iran up until the 2003 invasion of Iraq (including the assassination of Iranian general Ali Sayyad Shirazi in 1998, cross border raids, and mortar attacks). Iran carried out several airstrikes and missile attacks against Mujahedeen targets inside of Iraq (the largest taking place in 2001, when Iran fired 56 Scud missiles at Mujahedeen targets). In addition, according to General Hamdani, Iran continued to carry out low-level infiltrations of Iraqi territory, using Iraqi dissidents and anti-government activists rather than Iranian troops, in order to incite revolts. After the fall of Saddam in 2003, Hamdani claimed that Iranian agents infiltrated and created numerous militias in Iraq and built an intelligence system operating within the country.

In 2005, the new government of Iraq apologised to Iran for starting the war. The Iraqi government also commemorated the war with various monuments, including the Hands of Victory and the al-Shaheed Monument, both in Baghdad. The war also helped to create a forerunner for the Coalition of the Gulf War, when the Gulf Arab states banded together early in the war to form the Gulf Cooperation Council to help Iraq fight Iran.

Economic situation
The economic loss at the time was believed to exceed $500 billion for each country ($1.2 trillion total). In addition, economic development stalled and oil exports were disrupted. Iraq had accrued more than $130 billion of international debt, excluding interest, and was also weighed down by a slowed GDP growth. Iraq's debt to Paris Club amounted to $21 billion, 85% of which had originated from the combined inputs of Japan, the USSR, France, Germany, the United States, Italy and the United Kingdom. The largest portion of Iraq's debt, amounting to $130 billion, was to its former Arab backers, with $67 billion loaned by Kuwait, Saudi Arabia, Qatar, UAE, and Jordan. After the war, Iraq accused Kuwait of slant drilling and stealing oil, inciting its invasion of Kuwait, which in turn worsened Iraq's financial situation: the United Nations Compensation Commission mandated Iraq to pay reparations of more than $200 billion to victims of the invasion, including Kuwait and the United States. To enforce payment, Iraq was put under a comprehensive international embargo, which further strained the Iraqi economy and pushed its external debt to private and public sectors to more than $500 billion by the end of Saddam's rule. Combined with Iraq's negative economic growth after prolonged international sanctions, this produced a debt-to-GDP ratio of more than 1,000%, making Iraq the most indebted developing country in the world. The unsustainable economic situation compelled the new Iraqi government to request that a considerable portion of debt incurred during the Iran–Iraq war be written off.

Much of the oil industry of both countries was damaged in air raids.

Science and technology

The war had its impact on medical science: a surgical intervention for comatose patients with penetrating brain injuries was created by Iranian physicians treating wounded soldiers, later establishing neurosurgery guidelines to treat civilians who had suffered blunt or penetrating skull injuries. Iranian physicians' experience in the war informed the medical care of U.S. congresswoman Gabby Giffords after the 2011 Tucson shooting.

In addition to helping trigger the Persian Gulf War, the Iran–Iraq War also contributed to Iraq's defeat in the Persian Gulf War. Iraq's military was accustomed to fighting the slow moving Iranian infantry formations with artillery and static defenses, while using mostly unsophisticated tanks to gun down and shell the infantry and overwhelm the smaller Iranian tank force; in addition to being dependent on weapons of mass destruction to help secure victories. Therefore, they were rapidly overwhelmed by the high-tech, quick-maneuvering Coalition forces using modern doctrines such as AirLand Battle.

Domestic situation

Iraq

At first, Saddam attempted to ensure that the Iraqi population suffered from the war as little as possible. There was rationing, but civilian projects begun before the war continued. At the same time, the already extensive personality cult around Saddam reached new heights while the regime tightened its control over the military.

After the Iranian victories of the spring of 1982 and the Syrian closure of Iraq's main pipeline, Saddam did a volte-face on his policy towards the home front: a policy of austerity and total war was introduced, with the entire population being mobilised for the war effort. All Iraqis were ordered to donate blood and around 100,000 Iraqi civilians were ordered to clear the reeds in the southern marshes. Mass demonstrations of loyalty towards Saddam became more common. Saddam also began implementing a policy of discrimination against Iraqis of Iranian origin.

In the summer of 1982, Saddam began a campaign of terror. More than 300 Iraqi Army officers were executed for their failures on the battlefield. In 1983, a major crackdown was launched on the leadership of the Shia community. Ninety members of the al-Hakim family, an influential family of Shia clerics whose leading members were the émigrés Mohammad Baqir al-Hakim and Abdul Aziz al-Hakim, were arrested, and 6 were hanged.

The crackdown on Kurds saw 8,000 members of the Barzani clan, whose leader (Massoud Barzani) also led the Kurdistan Democratic Party, similarly executed. From 1983 onwards, a campaign of increasingly brutal repression was started against the Iraqi Kurds, characterised by Israeli historian Efraim Karsh as having "assumed genocidal proportions" by 1988. The al-Anfal Campaign was intended to "pacify" Iraqi Kurdistan permanently. By 1983, the Barzanis entered an alliance with Iran in defense against Saddam Hussein.

Gaining civilian support
To secure the loyalty of the Shia population, Saddam allowed more Shias into the Ba'ath Party and the government, and improved Shia living standards, which had been lower than those of the Iraqi Sunnis. Saddam had the state pay for restoring Imam Ali's tomb with white marble imported from Italy. The Baathists also increased their policies of repression against the Shia. The most infamous event was the massacre of 148 civilians of the Shia town of Dujail.

Despite the costs of the war, the Iraqi regime made generous contributions to Shia waqf (religious endowments) as part of the price of buying Iraqi Shia support. The importance of winning Shia support was such that welfare services in Shia areas were expanded during a time in which the Iraqi regime was pursuing austerity in all other non-military fields. During the first years of the war in the early 1980s, the Iraqi government tried to accommodate the Kurds in order to focus on the war against Iran. In 1983, the Patriotic Union of Kurdistan agreed to cooperate with Baghdad, but the Kurdistan Democratic Party (KDP) remained opposed. In 1983, Saddam signed an autonomy agreement with Jalal Talabani of the Patriotic Union of Kurdistan (PUK), though Saddam later reneged on the agreement. By 1985, the PUK and KDP had joined forces, and Iraqi Kurdistan saw widespread guerrilla warfare up to the end of the war.

Iran

Israeli-British historian Ephraim Karsh argued that the Iranian government saw the outbreak of war as chance to strengthen its position and consolidate the Islamic revolution, noting that government propaganda presented it domestically as a glorious jihad and a test of Iranian national character. The Iranian regime followed a policy of total war from the beginning, and attempted to mobilise the nation as a whole. They established a group known as the Reconstruction Campaign, whose members were exempted from conscription and were instead sent into the countryside to work on farms to replace the men serving at the front.

Iranian workers had a day's pay deducted from their pay cheques every month to help finance the war, and mass campaigns were launched to encourage the public to donate food, money, and blood. To further help finance the war, the Iranian government banned the import of all non-essential items, and launched a major effort to rebuild the damaged oil plants.

According to former Iraqi general Ra'ad al-Hamdani, the Iraqis believed that in addition to the Arab revolts, the Revolutionary Guards would be drawn out of Tehran, leading to a counter-revolution in Iran that would cause Khomeini's government to collapse and thus ensure Iraqi victory. However, rather than turning against the revolutionary government as experts had predicted, Iran's people (including Iranian Arabs) rallied in support of the country and put up a stiff resistance.

Civil unrest
In June 1981, street battles broke out between the Revolutionary Guard and the left-wing Mujaheddin e-Khalq (MEK), continuing for several days and killing hundreds on both sides. In September, more unrest broke out on the streets of Iran as the MEK attempted to seize power. Thousands of left-wing Iranians (many of whom were not associated with the MEK) were shot and hanged by the government. The MEK began an assassination campaign that killed hundreds of regime officials by the fall of 1981. On 28 June 1981, they assassinated the secretary-general of the Islamic Republican Party, Mohammad Beheshti and on 30 August, killed Iran's president, Mohammad-Ali Rajai. The government responded with mass executions of suspected MEK members, a practice that lasted until 1985.

In addition to the open civil conflict with the MEK, the Iranian government was faced with Iraqi-supported rebellions in Iranian Kurdistan, which were gradually put down through a campaign of systematic repression. 1985 also saw student anti-war demonstrations, which were crushed by government forces.

Economy
NEDSA commander announced in September 2020 that Iran spent $19.6 billion in the war. The war furthered the decline of the Iranian economy that had begun with the revolution in 1978–79. Between 1979 and 1981, foreign exchange reserves fell from $14.6 billion to $1 billion. As a result of the war, living standards dropped dramatically, and Iran was described by British journalists John Bulloch and Harvey Morris as "a dour and joyless place" ruled by a harsh regime that "seemed to have nothing to offer but endless war". Though Iran was becoming bankrupt, Khomeini interpreted Islam's prohibition of usury to mean they could not borrow against future oil revenues to meet war expenses. As a result, Iran funded the war by the income from oil exports after cash had run out. The revenue from oil dropped from $20 billion in 1982 to $5 billion in 1988. French historian Pierre Razoux argued that this sudden drop in economic industrial potential, in conjunction with the increasing aggression of Iraq, placed Iran in a challenging position that had little leeway other than accepting Iraq's conditions of peace.

In January 1985, former prime minister and anti-war Islamic Liberation Movement co-founder Mehdi Bazargan criticised the war in a telegram to the United Nations, calling it un-Islamic and illegitimate and arguing that Khomeini should have accepted Saddam's truce offer in 1982 instead of attempting to overthrow the Ba'ath. In a public letter to Khomeini sent in May 1988, he added "Since 1986, you have not stopped proclaiming victory, and now you are calling upon population to resist until victory. Is that not an admission of failure on your part?" Khomeini was annoyed by Bazargan's telegram, and issued a lengthy public rebuttal in which he defended the war as both Islamic and just.

By 1987, Iranian morale had begun to crumble, reflected in the failure of government campaigns to recruit "martyrs" for the front. Israeli historian Efraim Karsh points to the decline in morale in 1987–88 as being a major factor in Iran's decision to accept the ceasefire of 1988.

Not all saw the war in negative terms. The Islamic Revolution of Iran was strengthened and radicalised. The Iranian government-owned Etelaat newspaper wrote, "There is not a single school or town that is excluded from the happiness of 'holy defence' of the nation, from drinking the exquisite elixir of martyrdom, or from the sweet death of the martyr, who dies in order to live forever in paradise."

Comparison of Iraqi and Iranian military strength

Iran's regular Army had been purged after the 1979 Revolution, with most high-ranking officers either having fled the country or been executed.

At the beginning of the war, Iraq held a clear advantage in armour, while both nations were roughly equal in terms of artillery. The gap only widened as the war went on. Iran started with a stronger air force, but over time, the balance of power reversed in Iraq's favour (as Iraq was constantly expanding its military, while Iran was under arms sanctions). Estimates for 1980 and 1987 were:

The conflict has been compared to World War I in terms of the tactics used, including large-scale trench warfare with barbed wire stretched across trenches, manned machine gun posts, bayonet charges, human wave attacks across a no man's land, and extensive use of chemical weapons such as sulfur mustard by the Iraqi government against Iranian troops, civilians, and Kurds. The world powers United States and the Soviet Union, together with many Western and Arab countries, provided military, intelligence, economic, and political support for Iraq. On average, Iraq imported about $7 billion in weapons during every year of the war, accounting for fully 12% of global arms sales in the period. The value of Iraqi arms imports increased to between $12 billion and $14 billion during 1984–1987, whereas the value of Iranian arms imports fell from $14 billion in 1985 to $5.89 billion in 1986 and an estimated $6 billion to $8 billion in 1987. Iran was constrained by the price of oil during the 1980s oil glut as foreign countries were largely unwilling to extend credit to Iran, but Iraq financed its continued massive military expansion by taking on vast quantities of debt that allowed it to win a number of victories against Iran near the end of the war but that left the country bankrupt.

Despite its larger population, by 1988 Iran's ground forces numbered only 600,000 whereas the Iraqi army had grown to include 1 million soldiers.

Foreign support to Iraq and Iran

During the war, Iraq was regarded by the West and the Soviet Union as a counterbalance to post-revolutionary Iran. The Soviet Union, Iraq's main arms supplier during the war, did not wish for the end of its alliance with Iraq, and was alarmed by Saddam's threats to find new arms suppliers in the West and China if the Kremlin did not provide him with the weapons he wanted. The Soviet Union hoped to use the threat of reducing arms supplies to Iraq as leverage for forming a Soviet-Iranian alliance.

During the early years of the war, the United States lacked meaningful relations with either Iran or Iraq, the former due to the Iranian Revolution and the Iran hostage crisis and the latter because of Iraq's alliance with the Soviet Union and hostility towards Israel. Following Iran's success of repelling the Iraqi invasion and Khomeini's refusal to end the war in 1982, the United States made an outreach to Iraq, beginning with the restoration of diplomatic relations in 1984. The United States wished to both keep Iran away from Soviet influence and protect other Gulf states from any threat of Iranian expansion. As a result, it began to provide limited support to Iraq. In 1982, Henry Kissinger, former Secretary of State, outlined U.S. policy towards Iran:

The focus of Iranian pressure at this moment is Iraq. There are few governments in the world less deserving of our support and less capable of using it. Had Iraq won the war, the fear in the Gulf and the threat to our interest would be scarcely less than it is today. Still, given the importance of the balance of power in the area, it is in our interests to promote a ceasefire in that conflict; though not a cost that will preclude an eventual rapprochement with Iran either if a more moderate regime replaces Khomeini's or if the present rulers wake up to geopolitical reality that the historic threat to Iran's independence has always come from the country with which it shares a border of : the Soviet Union. A rapprochement with Iran, of course, must await at a minimum Iran's abandonment of hegemonic aspirations in the Gulf.

Richard Murphy, Assistant Secretary of State during the war, testified to Congress in 1984 that the Reagan administration believed a victory for either Iran or Iraq was "neither militarily feasible nor strategically desirable".

Support to Iraq was given via technological aid, intelligence, the sale of dual-use chemical and biological warfare related technology and military equipment, and satellite intelligence. While there was direct combat between Iran and the United States, it is not universally agreed that the fighting between the United States and Iran was specifically to benefit Iraq, or for separate issues between the U.S. and Iran. American official ambiguity towards which side to support was summed up by Henry Kissinger when he remarked, "It's a pity they both can't lose." The Americans and the British also either blocked or watered down UN resolutions that condemned Iraq for using chemical weapons against the Iranians and their own Kurdish citizens.

More than 30 countries provided support to Iraq, Iran, or both; most of the aid went to Iraq. Iran had a complex clandestine procurement network to obtain munitions and critical materials. Iraq had an even larger clandestine purchasing network, involving 10–12 allied countries, to maintain ambiguity over their arms purchases and to circumvent "official restrictions". Arab mercenaries and volunteers from Egypt and Jordan formed the Yarmouk Brigade and participated in the war alongside Iraqis.

Iraq

According to the Stockholm International Peace Institute, the Soviet Union, France, and China together accounted for over 90% of the value of Iraq's arms imports between 1980 and 1988.

The United States pursued policies in favour of Iraq by reopening diplomatic channels, lifting restrictions on the export of dual-use technology, overseeing the transfer of third-party military hardware, and providing operational intelligence on the battlefield. France, which from the 1970s had been one of Iraq's closest allies, was a major supplier of military hardware. The French sold weapons equal to $5 billion, which made up well over a quarter of Iraq's total arms stockpile. Citing French magazine Le Nouvel Observateur as the primary source, but also quoting French officials, the New York Times reported France had been sending chemical precursors of chemical weapons to Iraq, since 1986. China, which had no direct stake in the victory of either side and whose interests in the war were entirely commercial, freely sold arms to both sides.

Iraq also made extensive use of front companies, middlemen, secret ownership of all or part of companies all over the world, forged end-user certificates, and other methods to hide what it was acquiring. Some transactions may have involved people, shipping, and manufacturing in as many as 10 countries. Support from Great Britain exemplified the methods by which Iraq would circumvent export controls. Iraq bought at least one British company with operations in the United Kingdom and the United States, and had a complex relationship with France and the Soviet Union, its major suppliers of actual weapons. Turkey took action against the Kurds in 1986, alleging they were attacking the Kurdistan Workers' Party (PKK), which prompted a harsh diplomatic intervention by Iran, which planned a new offensive against Iraq at the time and were counting on the support of Kurdish factions.

Sudan supported Iraq directly during the war, sending a contingent to fight at the frontlines. The Sudanese unit consisted to a large degree of Ugandan refugees from the West Nile Region, recruited by Juma Oris.

The United Nations Security Council initially called for a cease-fire after a week of fighting while Iraq was occupying Iranian territory, and renewed the call on later occasions. However, the UN did not come to Iran's aid to repel the Iraqi invasion, and the Iranians thus interpreted the UN as subtly biased in favour of Iraq.

Financial support
Iraq's main financial backers were the oil-rich Persian Gulf states, most notably Saudi Arabia ($30.9 billion), Kuwait ($8.2 billion), and the United Arab Emirates ($8 billion). In all, Iraq received $35 billion in loans from the West and between $30 and $40 billion from the Persian Gulf states during the 1980s.

The Iraqgate scandal revealed that a branch of Italy's largest bank, Banca Nazionale del Lavoro (BNL), in Atlanta, Georgia, relied partially on U.S. taxpayer-guaranteed loans to funnel $5 billion to Iraq from 1985 to 1989. In August 1989, when FBI agents raided the Atlanta branch of BNL, branch manager Christopher Drogoul was charged with making unauthorised, clandestine, and illegal loans to Iraq—some of which, according to his indictment, were used to purchase arms and weapons technology. According to the Financial Times, Hewlett-Packard, Tektronix, and Matrix Churchill's branch in Ohio were among the companies shipping militarily useful technology to Iraq under the eye of the U.S. government.

Iran

While the United States directly fought Iran, citing freedom of navigation as a major casus belli, it also indirectly supplied some weapons to Iran as part of a complex and illegal programme that became known as the Iran–Contra affair. These secret sales were partly to help secure the release of hostages held in Lebanon, and partly to make money to help the Contras rebel group in Nicaragua. This arms-for-hostages agreement turned into a major scandal.

North Korea was a major arms supplier to Iran, often acting as a third party in arms deals between Iran and the Communist bloc. Support included domestically manufactured arms and Eastern-Bloc weapons, for which the major powers wanted deniability. Among the other arms suppliers and supporters of Iran's Islamic Revolution, the major ones were Libya, Syria, and China. According to the Stockholm International Peace Institute, China was the largest foreign arms supplier to Iran between 1980 and 1988.

Syria and Libya, breaking Arab solidarity, supported Iran with arms, rhetoric and diplomacy. However, Libya then distanced itself from Iran from 1987, criticizing Tehran's attitude and restoring diplomatic relations with Iraq.

Aid to both countries
Besides the United States and the Soviet Union, Yugoslavia also sold weapons to both countries for the entire duration of the conflict. Likewise, Portugal helped both countries; it was not unusual to see Iranian and Iraqi flagged ships anchored at Setúbal, waiting their turn to dock.

From 1980 to 1987, Spain sold €458 million in weapons to Iran and €172 million to Iraq. Weapons sold to Iraq included 4x4 vehicles, BO-105 helicopters, explosives, and ammunition. A research party later discovered that an unexploded chemical Iraqi warhead in Iran was manufactured in Spain.

Although neither side acquired any weapons from Turkey, both sides enjoyed Turkish civilian trade during the conflict, although the Turkish government remained neutral and refused to support the U.S.-imposed trade embargo on Iran. Turkey's export market jumped from $220 million in 1981 to $2 billion in 1985, making up 25% of Turkey's overall exports. Turkish construction projects in Iraq totaled $2.5 billion between 1974 and 1990. Trading with both countries helped Turkey to offset its ongoing economic crisis, though the benefits decreased as the war neared its end and accordingly disappeared entirely with Iraq's invasion of Kuwait and the resulting Iraq sanctions Turkey imposed in response.

U.S. involvement

American support for Ba'athist Iraq during the Iran–Iraq War, in which it fought against post-revolutionary Iran, included several billion dollars' worth of economic aid, the sale of dual-use technology, non-U.S. origin weaponry, military intelligence, and special operations training. The U.S. refused to sell arms to Iraq directly due to Iraq's ties to terrorist groups, but several sales of "dual-use" technology have been documented; notably, Iraq purchased 45 Bell helicopters for $200 million in 1985. Total sales of U.S. dual-use technology to Iraq are estimated at $500 million.

U.S. government support for Iraq was not a secret and was frequently discussed in open sessions of the Senate and House of Representatives. American views toward Iraq were not enthusiastically supportive in its conflict with Iran, and activity in assistance was largely to prevent an Iranian victory. This was encapsulated by Henry Kissinger when he remarked, "It's a pity they both can't lose."

U.S. embargo

A key element of U.S. political–military and energy–economic planning occurred in early 1983. The Iran–Iraq war had been going on for three years and there were significant casualties on both sides, reaching hundreds of thousands. Within the Reagan National Security Council concern was growing that the war could spread beyond the boundaries of the two belligerents. A National Security Planning Group meeting was called chaired by Vice President George Bush to review U.S. options. It was determined that there was a high likelihood that the conflict would spread into Saudi Arabia and other Gulf states, but that the United States had little capability to defend the region. Furthermore, it was determined that a prolonged war in the region would induce much higher oil prices and threaten the fragile world recovery which was just beginning to gain momentum. On 22 May 1984, President Reagan was briefed on the project conclusions in the Oval Office by William Flynn Martin who had served as the head of the NSC staff that organized the study. The full declassified presentation can be seen here. The conclusions were threefold: firstly, oil stocks needed to be increased among members of the International Energy Agency and, if necessary, released early in the event of oil market disruption; second, the United States needed to reinforce the security of friendly Arab states in the region; and thirdly, an embargo should be placed on sales of military equipment to Iran and Iraq. The plan was approved by the President and later affirmed by the G-7 leaders headed by Margaret Thatcher in the London Summit of 1984.

U.S. knowledge of Iraqi chemical weapons use

According to Foreign Policy, the "Iraqis used mustard gas and sarin prior to four major offensives in early 1988 that relied on U.S. satellite imagery, maps, and other intelligence. ... According to recently declassified CIA documents and interviews with former intelligence officials like Francona, the U.S. had firm evidence of Iraqi chemical attacks beginning in 1983."

Iraqi attack on U.S. warship

The first struck the port side of the ship and failed to explode, though it left burning propellant in its wake; the second struck moments later in approximately the same place and penetrated through to crew quarters, where it exploded, killing 37 crew members and leaving 21 injured. Whether or not Iraqi leadership authorised the attack is still unknown. Initial claims by the Iraqi government (that Stark was inside the Iran–Iraq War zone) were shown to be false, and the motives and orders of the pilot remain unanswered. Though American officials claimed that the pilot who attacked Stark had been executed, an ex-Iraqi Air Force commander since stated he had not been punished, and was still alive at the time. The attack remains the only successful anti-ship missile strike on an American warship. Due to the extensive political and military cooperation between the Iraqis and Americans by 1987, the attack had little effect on relations between the two countries.

U.S. military actions toward Iran

U.S. attention was focused on isolating Iran as well as maintaining freedom of navigation. It criticised Iran's mining of international waters, and sponsored UN Security Council Resolution 598, which passed unanimously on 20 July, under which the U.S. and Iranian forces skirmished during Operation Earnest Will. During Operation Nimble Archer in October 1987, the United States attacked Iranian oil platforms in retaliation for an Iranian attack on the U.S.-flagged Kuwaiti tanker Sea Isle City.

On 14 April 1988, the frigate  was badly damaged by an Iranian mine, and 10 sailors were wounded. U.S. forces responded with Operation Praying Mantis on 18 April, the U.S. Navy's largest engagement of surface warships since World War II. Two Iranian oil platforms were destroyed, and five Iranian warships and gunboats were sunk. An American helicopter also crashed. This fighting manifested in the International Court of Justice as Oil Platforms case (Islamic Republic of Iran v. United States of America), which was eventually dismissed in 2003.

U.S. shoots down civilian airliner
In the course of escorts by the U.S. Navy, the cruiser  shot down Iran Air Flight 655 on 3 July 1988, killing all 290 passengers and crew on board. The American government claimed that Vincennes was in international waters at the time (which was later proven to be untrue), that the Airbus A300 had been mistaken for an Iranian F-14 Tomcat, and that Vincennes feared that she was under attack. The Iranians maintain that Vincennes was in their own waters, and that the passenger jet was turning away and increasing altitude after take-off. U.S. Admiral William J. Crowe later admitted on Nightline that Vincennes was in Iranian territorial waters when it launched the missiles. At the time of the attack, Admiral Crowe claimed that the Iranian plane did not identify itself and sent no response to warning signals he had sent. In 1996, the United States expressed their regret for the event and the civilian deaths it caused.

Iraq's use of chemical weapons

In a declassified 1991 report, the CIA estimated that Iran had suffered more than 50,000 casualties from Iraq's use of several chemical weapons, though current estimates are more than 100,000 as the long-term effects continue to cause casualties. The official CIA estimate did not include the civilian population contaminated in bordering towns or the children and relatives of veterans, many of whom have developed blood, lung and skin complications, according to the Organization for Veterans of Iran. According to a 2002 article in the Star-Ledger, 20,000 Iranian soldiers were killed on the spot by nerve gas. As of 2002, 5,000 of the 80,000 survivors continue to seek regular medical treatment, while 1,000 are hospital inpatients.

According to Iraqi documents, assistance in developing chemical weapons was obtained from firms in many countries, including the United States, West Germany, the Netherlands, the United Kingdom, and France. A report stated that Dutch, Australian, Italian, French and both West and East German companies were involved in the export of raw materials to Iraqi chemical weapons factories. Declassified CIA documents show that the United States was providing reconnaissance intelligence to Iraq around 1987–88 which was then used to launch chemical weapon attacks on Iranian troops and that the CIA fully knew that chemical weapons would be deployed and sarin and cyclosarin attacks followed.

On 21 March 1986, the United Nations Security Council made a declaration stating that "members are profoundly concerned by the unanimous conclusion of the specialists that chemical weapons on many occasions have been used by Iraqi forces against Iranian troops, and the members of the Council strongly condemn this continued use of chemical weapons in clear violation of the Geneva Protocol of 1925, which prohibits the use in war of chemical weapons." The United States was the only member who voted against the issuance of this statement. A mission to the region in 1988 found evidence of the use of chemical weapons, and was condemned in Security Council Resolution 612.

According to W. Patrick Lang, senior defense intelligence officer at the U.S. Defense Intelligence Agency, "the use of gas on the battlefield by the Iraqis was not a matter of deep strategic concern" to Reagan and his aides, because they "were desperate to make sure that Iraq did not lose". He claimed that the Defense Intelligence Agency "would have never accepted the use of chemical weapons against civilians, but the use against military objectives was seen as inevitable in the Iraqi struggle for survival". The Reagan administration did not stop aiding Iraq after receiving reports of the use of poison gas on Kurdish civilians.

The United States accused Iran of using chemical weapons as well, though the allegations have been disputed. Joost Hiltermann, the principal researcher for Human Rights Watch between 1992 and 1994, conducted a two-year study that included a field investigation in Iraq, and obtained Iraqi government documents in the process. According to Hiltermann, the literature on the Iran–Iraq War reflects allegations of chemical weapons used by Iran, but they are "marred by a lack of specificity as to time and place, and the failure to provide any sort of evidence".

Analysts Gary Sick and Lawrence Potter have called the allegations against Iran "mere assertions" and stated, "No persuasive evidence of the claim that Iran was the primary culprit [of using chemical weapons] was ever presented." Policy consultant and author Joseph Tragert stated, "Iran did not retaliate with chemical weapons, probably because it did not possess any at the time". Documents uncovered after the 2003 invasion of Iraq show that Iraqi military intelligence was not aware of any large-scale chemical attacks by Iranian forces, although a March 1987 document describes five small-scale chemical attacks perpetrated by the Iranians (four involving mustard gas and one involving phosgene, with the likely source being captured Iraqi munitions), and there are also reports of Iranian use of tear gas and white phosphorus.

At his trial in December 2006, Saddam said he would take responsibility "with honour" for any attacks on Iran using conventional or chemical weapons during the war, but that he took issue with the charges that he ordered attacks on Iraqis. A medical analysis of the effects of Iraqi mustard gas is described in a U.S. military textbook and contrasted effects of World War I gas.

At the time of the conflict, the United Nations Security Council issued statements that "chemical weapons had been used in the war". UN statements never clarified that only Iraq was using chemical weapons, and according to retrospective authors "the international community remained silent as Iraq used weapons of mass destruction against Iranian[s] as well as Iraqi Kurds." A 1987 UN report conducted at the behest of both belligerents discovered weapon fragments that established Iraqi responsibility for chemical attacks on Iranian soldiers and civilians, but could not substantiate Iraq's allegations of Iranian chemical weapons use: "Iraqi forces have been affected by mustard gas and a pulmonary element, possibly phosgene. In the absence of conclusive evidence of the weapons used, it could not be determined how the injuries were caused." Evidence suggests that these Iraqi chemical casualties were likely the result of "blowback," whereas the evidence that Iraq submitted to the UN—such as two Iranian 130 mm shells that UN specialists found had "no internal chemical-resistant coating" and were "normally used for filling with high explosives"—did not withstand scrutiny; UN official Iqbal Riza later acknowledged that Iraq's evidence was "clearly fabricated." However, the report's phrasing—"chemical weapons were again used against Iranian forces by Iraqi forces ... now also Iraqi forces have sustained injuries from chemical warfare"—contributed to an erroneous perception that Iran and Iraq were equally at fault.

In response to further Iraqi chemical attacks on Kurdish civilians after the August 1988 ceasefire with Iran, United States senators Claiborne Pell and Jesse Helms called for comprehensive economic sanctions against Iraq, including an oil embargo and severe limitations on the export of dual-use technology. Although the ensuing legislation passed in the U.S. Senate, it faced strong opposition within the House of Representatives and did not become law. In a rare rebuke, Secretary of State George Shultz condemned Iraq's "unjustified and abhorrent" chemical attacks, which Shultz's assistant Charles E. Redman characterized as "unacceptable to the civilized world." Even after these pronouncements, however, the State Department advised against sanctions.

Comparison to other conflicts

Bruce Riedel describes the Iran–Iraq War as "one of the largest and longest conventional interstate wars" of the twentieth century and "the only war in modern times in which chemical weapons were used on a massive scale." Kanan Makiya writes that "there has not been anything like it in the long history of Iraqi–Iranian relations, just like there had been nothing like World War I in the history of Europe."

Iran's attack on the Osirak nuclear reactor in September 1980 was the first attack on a nuclear reactor and one of only a small handful of military attacks on nuclear facilities in history. It was also the first instance of a pre-emptive attack on a nuclear reactor to forestall the development of a nuclear weapon, though it did not achieve its objective, as France repaired the reactor after the attack. (It took a second pre-emptive strike by the Israeli Air Force in June 1981 to disable the reactor, killing a French engineer in the process and causing France to pull out of Osirak. The decommissioning of Osirak has been cited as causing a substantial delay to Iraqi acquisition of nuclear weapons.)

The Iran–Iraq War was the first conflict in the history of warfare in which both forces used ballistic missiles against each other. This war also saw the only confirmed air-to-air helicopter battles in history with the Iraqi Mi-25s flying against Iranian AH-1J SeaCobras (supplied by the United States before the Iranian Revolution) on several separate occasions. In November 1980, not long after Iraq's initial invasion of Iran, two Iranian SeaCobras engaged two Mi-25s with TOW wire-guided antitank missiles. One Mi-25 went down immediately, the other was badly damaged and crashed before reaching base. The Iranians repeated this accomplishment on 24 April 1981, destroying two Mi-25s without incurring losses to themselves. One Mi-25 was also downed by an Iranian F-14A Tomcat. The Iraqis hit back, claiming the destruction of a SeaCobra on 14 September 1983 (with YaKB machine gun), then three SeaCobras on 5 February 1984 and three more on 25 February 1984 (two with Falanga missiles, one with S-5 rockets). After a lull in helicopter losses, each side lost a gunship on 13 February 1986. Later, a Mi-25 claimed a SeaCobra shot down with YaKB gun on 16 February, and a SeaCobra claimed a Mi-25 shot down with rockets on 18 February. The last engagement between the two types was on 22 May 1986, when Mi-25s shot down a SeaCobra. The final claim tally was 10 SeaCobras and 6 Mi-25s destroyed. The relatively small numbers and the inevitable disputes over actual kill numbers makes it unclear if one gunship had a real technical superiority over the other. Iraqi Mi-25s also claimed 43 kills against other Iranian helicopters, such as Agusta-Bell UH-1 Hueys. Both sides, especially Iraq, also carried out air and missile attacks against population centres.

In October 1986, Iraqi aircraft began to attack civilian passenger trains and aircraft on Iranian soil, including an Iran Air Boeing 737 unloading passengers at Shiraz International Airport. In retaliation for the Iranian Operation Karbala 5, Iraq attacked 65 cities in 226 sorties over 42 days, bombing civilian neighbourhoods. Eight Iranian cities came under attack from Iraqi missiles. The bombings killed 65 children in an elementary school in Borujerd. The Iranians responded with Scud missile attacks on Baghdad and struck a primary school there. These events became known as the "War of the Cities". The "War of the Cities" resumed and peaked in 1988, when Iraq dropped 40 tons of high explosives on Tehran using modified Scud missiles (dubbed "al-Hussein" missiles) over seven weeks, causing panic among civilians and prompting almost 1 million residents of Tehran to temporarily flee their homes. Nevertheless, scholars have noted that this still "ranks as one of the smallest strategic bombing campaigns in history," paling in comparison to strategic bombing during World War II, which saw 1.2 million tons of bombs dropped on German cities in 1944 alone, or more recent events such as the so-called "Christmas bombings" of North Vietnam, which saw 20,000 tons of bombs dropped on Hanoi and Haiphong in a mere eleven days. In total, 10,000–11,000 civilians died as a result of the aerial bombardment of Iranian cities with the majority of those deaths occurring in the final year of the war.

Despite the war, Iran and Iraq maintained diplomatic relations and embassies in each other's countries until mid-1987.

Iran's government used human waves to attack enemy troops and even in some cases to clear minefields. Children volunteered as well. Some reports mistakenly have the Basijis marching into battle while marking their expected entry to heaven by wearing "Plastic Keys to Paradise" around their necks, although other analysts regard this story as a hoax involving a misinterpretation of the carrying of a prayer book called "The Keys to Paradise"(Mafatih al-Janan) by Sheikh Abbas Qumi given to all volunteers.

According to journalist Robin Wright:

During the Fateh offensive in February 1987, I toured the southwest front on the Iranian side and saw scores of boys, aged anywhere from nine to sixteen, who said with staggering and seemingly genuine enthusiasm that they had volunteered to become martyrs. Regular army troops, the paramilitary Revolutionary Guards and mullahs all lauded these youths, known as baseeji [Basij], for having played the most dangerous role in breaking through Iraqi lines. They had led the way, running over fields of mines to clear the ground for the Iranian ground assault. Wearing white headbands to signify the embracing of death, and shouting "Shaheed, shaheed" (Martyr, martyr) they literally blew their way into heaven. Their numbers were never disclosed. But a walk through the residential suburbs of Iranian cities provided a clue. Window after window, block after block, displayed black-bordered photographs of teenage or preteen youths.

Iran and Iraq's modern relationship 

The relationship between these two nations has warmed immensely since the downfall of Saddam Hussein, but mostly out of pragmatic interest. Iran and Iraq share many common interests, as they share a common enemy in the Islamic State. Significant military assistance has been provided by Iran to Iraq and this has bought them a large amount of political influence in Iraq's newly elected Shia government. Iraq is also heavily dependent on the more stable and developed Iran for its energy needs, so a peaceful customer is likely a high priority for Iran, foreign policy wise.

The Iran–Iraq War is regarded as being a major trigger for rising sectarianism in the region, as it was viewed by many as a clash between Sunni Muslims (Iraq and other Arab States) and the Shia revolutionaries that had recently taken power in Iran. There remains lingering animosity however; despite the pragmatic alliance that has been formed as multiple government declarations from Iran have stated that the war will "affect every issue of internal and foreign policy" for decades to come. The sustained importance of this conflict is attributed mostly to the massive human and economic cost resulting from it, along with its ties to the Iranian Revolution. Another significant effect that the war has on Iran's policy is the issue of remaining war reparations. The UN estimates that Iraq owes about $149 billion, while Iran contends that, with both the direct and indirect effects taken into account, the cost of the war reaches a trillion. Iran has not vocalized the desire for these reparations in recent years, and has even suggested forms of financial aid. This is due most likely to Iran's interest in keeping Iraq politically stable, and imposing these reparation costs would further burden the already impoverished nation. The most important factor that governs Iraq's current foreign policy is the national government's consistent fragility following the overthrow of Saddam Hussein. Iraq's need for any and all allies that can help bring stability and bring development has allowed Iran to exert significant influence over the new Iraqi state; despite lingering memories of the war. Iraq is far too weak of a state to attempt to challenge Iran regionally, so accepting support while focusing on counter insurgency and stabilization is in their best interest.

Currently, it seems as though Iraq is being pulled in two opposing directions, between a practical relationship with Iran, who can provide a reliable source of power as well as military support to the influential Shia militias and political factions. The United States is pulling in the opposite direction as they offer Iraq significant economic aid packages, along with military support in the form of air and artillery strikes, all in the hopes to establish a stable ally in the region. If Iraq lurches too far in either direction, then the benefits offered to them by the other side will likely be gradually reduced or cut off completely. Another significant factor influencing relations is the shared cultural interests of their respective citizens, as they both wish to freely visit the multitude of holy sites located in both countries.

Cultural impression
"We are armed with Allahu Akbar", the 1979 Iranian Islamic revolutionary military march song performed by IRGC troops in front of Ayatollah Khomeini in Jamaran Husinie, made a cultural impact during the war.

See also 

 Disabled Iranian Veterans
 Iran-Iraq border
 Iran-Iraq relations
 Iran–Saudi Arabia proxy conflict
 Iran–United States relations
 Iraq–United States relations
 Iran–Contra affair
 Operation Babylon
 Israel's role in the Iran–Iraq war
 1986 Iquique arms factory explosion
 1988 executions of Iranian political prisoners
 Rahian-e Noor
 Reagan Doctrine
 Women in the Iran–Iraq War
 Iraqi embassy bombing in Beirut

Persons
 Frans van Anraat
 Morteza Avini, prominent photographer of the Iran–Iraq War, creator of Revayat-e Fath
 Kaveh Golestan
 Ebrahim Hatamikia, Iranian filmmaker
 List of Iranian commanders in the Iran–Iraq War
 Marjane Satrapi, French-Iranian author

Memoirs
 Eternal Fragrance (Last Sunday)
 Noureddin, Son of Iran
 One Woman's War: Da (Mother)

Stories
 A City Under Siege: Tales of the Iran-Iraq War
 Persepolis

Relevant conflicts
 Al-Fakkah Field dispute
 Baluchi Autonomist Movement
 List of modern conflicts in the Middle East

Notes

References

Citations

Sources 

 
 
 
 
 
 
 
 
 
 
  (syndicated by New York Times Syndication Sales, 1987, published in book form as "Öl ins Feuer Internationale Waffengeschäfte im Golfkrieg" Orell Füssli Verlag Zürich and Wiesbaden 1988

Further reading 
 Chubin, Shahram, and Charles Tripp. Iran and Iraq at War (Routledge, 2020) online review

External links

 Iran-Iraq: Background to the War (Video on YouTube: AP Archive)
 Iran-Iraq War; Photos by Alfred Yaghobzadeh

 
1980s in Iran
1980s in Iraq
1980s conflicts
Articles containing video clips
Conflicts involving the People's Mojahedin Organization of Iran
History of the Islamic Republic of Iran
Invasions of Iran
Invasions by Iraq
Iran–Iraq relations
Wars involving Iran
Wars involving Iraq
Wars involving the Peshmerga
History of the Persian Gulf
Saddam Hussein
Ruhollah Khomeini
Iran–Saudi Arabia relations
Iran–United States relations